= List of goddesses =

This is a list of goddesses and deities regarded as female or mostly feminine in gender.

== African goddesses ==
Fon

- Gbadu
- Gleti
- Mawu
- Nana Buluku

Haitian Voudou

- Adjassou-Linguetor
- Ayida Wedo
- Ayizan
- Erzulie
- Filomez
- Mademoiselle Charlotte
- Maîtresse Délai
- Maîtresse Hounon'gon
- Maman Brigitte
- Marinette

Isese

- Aja
- Egungun-oya
- Iyami Aje
- Oba
- Olokun
- Orisa Oluwa
- Oshun
- Oya
- Queen Oronsen
- Velekete
- Yemoja

Kongolese

- Bunzi
- Nzambici
- Simbi

Libyco-Berber

- Aisha Qandicha
- Afri
- Ayyur
- Chaxiraxi
- Magec
- Moneiba
- Nanna Tala
- Tafukt
- Tanit
- Tinjis

Odinani

- Ahia Njoku
- Ala
- Anyanwu

Other

- Abuk (Dinka)
- Amesemi (Kushite)
- Anaisa Pye (Dominican Vudu)
- Andriamahilala (Fomba Gasy)
- Asase Yaa (Akan)
- Atete (Waaqeffanna)
- Ayao (Santeria)
- Emotan (Edo)
- Kianda (Ambundu)
- Mami Wata (panafrican)
- Mbokomu (Ngombe)
- Mamlambo (Zulu)
- Nyabinghi (Nande)
- Olapa (Maasai)
- Pomba Gira (Umbanda)
- Usiququmadevu (Zulu)
- Wagadu (Mande)
- Woyengi (Ijaw)

== American goddesses ==
Andean

- Axomamma
- Ka-Ata-Killa
- Mama Killa
- Mama Ocllo
- Mama Qucha
- Pachamama

Haudenosaunee

- Atahensic
- Gendenwitha
- Lelawala

Hopi

- Ahöl Mana
- Angwusnasomtaka
- Kokopelmimi

Inuit

- A'akuluujjusi
- Akna
- Akycha
- Arnakuagsak
- Arnapkapfaaluk
- Asiaq
- Ataksak
- Caribou mother
- Idliragijenget
- Kadlu
- Nerrivik
- Nujalik
- Nuliajuk
- Pinga
- Pukkeenegak
- Qailertetang
- Sedna
- Siqiniq
- Tootega

Lakota

- Anog Ite
- Unhcegila
- White Buffalo Calf Woman
- Hanhepi Wi
- Wohpe

Maya

- Awilix
- Chac Chel
- Chirakan-Ixmucane
- Goddess I
- Ixchel
- Ixtab
- Maya moon goddess
- Xbaquiyalo
- Xmucane
- Xquic
- Xtabay

Muisca

- Bachué
- Chía
- Huitaca

Nahua

- Chalchiuhtlicue
- Chantico
- Chicomecoatl
- Chimalma
- Cihuacoatl
- Cihuateteo
- Citlalicue
- Coatlicue
- Coyolxāuhqui
- Huixtocihuatl
- Itzpapalotl
- Malinalxochitl
- Mayahuel
- Metztli
- Mictecacihuatl
- Oxomoco
- Temazcalteci
- Tlazolteotl
- Toci
- Tonacacihuatl
- Tonantzin
- Tzitzimitl
- Xochiquetzal
- Xochitlicue
- Yohaulticetl

Other

- Asdzą́ą́ Nádleehé (Navajo)
- Atabey (Taino)
- Atira (Pawnee)
- Caipora (Tupi)
- Dzelarhons (Haida)
- Dzunukwa (Kwakwakawakw)
- Eschetewuarha (Chamacoco)
- Granny Squannit (Wampanoag)
- Great Goddess of Teotihuacan
- Guabancex (Taino)
- Iyatiku (Keresan)
- Kasogonagá (Toba)
- Kueyen (Mapuche)
- María Lionza (Venezuelan)
- Pincoya (Mapuche)
- Qamaits (Nuxalk)
- Santa Muerte (Mexican)
- Tia (Haida)
- Tsichtinako (Keresan)

== Asian goddesses ==
Ainu

- Hasinaw-uk-kamuy
- Kamuy-huci
- Kenas-unarpe
- Tokapcup-kamuy
- Waka-ush Kamuy
- Yushkep Kamuy

Buddhist

- Achi Chokyi Drolma
- Benzaiten
- Chinnamunda
- Cundi
- Ekajati
- Guanyin
- Hariti
- Śrīmahādevī
- Ksitigarbha
- Kurukullā
- Mandarava
- Manimekhala
- Marici
- Nairatmya
- Narodakini
- Palden Lhamo
- Phra Mae Thorani
- Puti Shushen
- Samantabhadri
- Samding Dorje Phagmo
- Sitatapatra
- Tara
- Tenma goddesses
- Tummo
- Vajrayogini
- Vasudhara
- Yeshe Tsogyal

Burmese

- Amay Gyan
- Amay Yay Yin
- Anauk Mibaya
- Bago Medaw
- Hnamadawgyi
- Htibyuhsaung Medaw
- Ma Aung Phyu
- Ma Ngwe Taung
- Ma Phae Wah
- Medaw Shwezaga
- Mya Nan Nwe
- Myaukhpet Shinma
- Pale Yin
- Panhtwar
- Ponmagyi
- Popa Medaw
- Saw Mya Thar
- Shingon
- Shingwa
- Shin Nemi
- Shwe Nabay
- Taungdaw Thakhinma
- Thonbanhla
  - Princess Thonbanhla
- Thurathadi

Chinese

- Bai Mudan
- Bai Suzhen
- Bixiao Niangniang
- Bixia Yuanjun
- Canmu
- Cao E
- Chang'e
- Changxi
- Chen Jinggu
- Chitou Furen
- Chuangmu
- Daji
- Doumu
- Feng popo
- Goddess Golden Flower
- He Xiangu
- Holy Mother the Original Lord
- Houtu
- Hua Mulan
- Huang Daopo
- Huaxu
- Jiang Yuan
- Jingwei
- Jiutian Xuannü
- Lan Caihe
- Leizi
- Leizu
- Liang Hongyu
- Lim Ko Niao
- Lishan Laomu
- Liu Jinding
- Li Xiu
- Li Ye
- Longmu
- Longnü
- Luoshen
- Magu
- Manojñaśuci
- Mazu
- Meng Jian Nü
- Meng Po
- Mu Guiying
- Nüba
- Nü Tofu
- Nüwa
- Pan Jinlian
- Prajñāpāramitā Devī
- Qin Liangyu
- Qiongxiao Niangniang
- Qiu Jin
- Saoqing Niang
- Shuimu
- Songzi Niangniang
- Sun Bu'er
- Sunü
- Taiyin Xingjun
- Wei Huacun
- Wusheng Laomu
- Xi Shi
- Xian Furen
- Xiangshuishen
- Xihe
- Xiwangmu
- Yaoji
- Yunxiao Niangniang
- Yu Shiqie
- Yu Xuanji
- Zhinü
- Zigu

Indian

- Aditi
- Agneya
- Alakshmi
- Ambika
- Ammavaru
- Anasuya
- Ankalamma
- Ankalaparamecuvari
- Anumati
- Apsaras
- Aranyani
- Arundhati
- Ashapura Mata
- Ashokasundari
  - Bala Tripurasundari
- Asvayujau
- Badi Mata
- Bankamundi
- Banai
- Bhadra
- Bharat Mata
- Bhūmi
- Bonbibi
- Budhi Pallien
- Chelamma
- Chenjiamman
- Chhaya
- Danu
- Dev Mogra
- Devaki
- Devasena
- Devi
  - Dhumavati
- Devi Kanya Kumari
- Dhisana
- Diti
- Durga Ashtami
- Durga Puja
- Ekanamsha
- Gajalakshmi
- Ganga
- Gayatri
- Harkor
- Harsidhhi
- Hemadryamba
- Hinglaj Mata
- Ila
- Isakki
- Ishvari
- Jagaddhatri
- Jaganmata
- Jagdamba
- Jayanti
- Jeenmata
- Jivdani Mata
- Jwala
- Kadangot Makkam
- Kadru
- Kali
- Kamadhenu
- Kamakshi
- Kamakhya
- Kamalatmika
- Kanike
- Kannagi
- Karaikkal Ammaiyar
- Karni Mata
- Kateri Amman
- Kaumari
- Kaushiki
- Khemukhi
- Khodiyar
- Kolaramma
- Korravai
- Kubjika
- Kumari
- Kurupuram
- Lajja Gauri
- MahaLakshmi
  - Alamelu
  - Ashta Lakshmi
- Lankini
- Maa Tarini
- Maalikapurathamma
- Madayi Kavu
- Mahadevi
  - Jhandewali Mata
  - Vishvambhari
- Mahakali
- Mahavidya
- Maheshvari
- Maisamma
- Manakamana
- Manasa
- Manda
- Manisha
- Matangi
- Matrikas
- Maula Kalika
- Meldi Mata
- Mhalsa
- Modheshwari
- Mogal Maa
- Mohini
- Momai
- Mumbadevi
- Muthyalamma
- Nagalakshmi
- Nagnechiya Maa
- Nakshatras
  - Abhijit
  - Ashlesha
  - Ashvini
  - Bharani
  - Dhanishta
  - Jyestha
  - Kṛttikā
  - Mrigashīrsha
  - Mula
  - Punarvasu
  - Pūrva Bhādrapadā
  - Pushya
  - Revati
  - Shatabhisha
  - Shravana
  - Svati
  - Uttara Ashadha
  - Uttara Bhādrapadā
  - Vishākhā
- Nandni Mata
- Nila Devi
- Nirṛti
- Panchakanya
- Paranasabari
- Parvati
  - Akilandeswari
  - Ambika
  - Annapurna Devi Mata
  - Brahmani
  - Bhutamata
  - Durga
    - Bambar Baini
    - Bhadrakali
    - Bhagavati
    - Bhavani
    - Bhuvaneshvari
    - Bipodtarini Devi
    - Brahmacharini
    - Chamunda
    - Chanda
    - Navadurga
      - Chandraghanta
      - Kalaratri
      - Kātyāyanī
      - Kushmanda
      - Mahagauri
      - Shailaputri
      - Siddhidhatri
      - Skandamata
    - Vanadurga
  - Tripura Sundari
    - Bagalamukhi
- Pathibhara
- Periyachi
- Phul Mata
- Pidari
- Poleramma
- Prasuti
- Pratyangira
- Prithvi
- Putana
- Radha
- Rakteswari
- Rati
- Ratri
- Renuka
- Revati
- Rudrani
- Rukmini
- Sachiya
- Samaleswari
- Santoshi Mata
- Sarama
- Saranyu
- Saraswati
- Sarthal Mata
- Sati
- Satyabhama
- Shachi
- Shakambhari
- Shakti
  - Adi Parashakti
    - Bhairavi
    - Chandi
    - Chhinnamasta
    - Mookambika
  - Bahuchara Mata
  - Bhramari
  - Gangamma Devi
- Shantadurga
- Shashthi
- Shatarupa
- Sheetla
- Shitala
- Shivadooti
- Sinivali
- Sita
- Sri Ramalinga Sowdeswari Amman
- Surasa
- Suswani Mataji
- Svaha
- Swasthani
- Tapati
- Tara
- Tridevi
- Trijata
- Tulsi
- Uchitta Bhagavathy
- Ushas
- Vāc
- Vaishnavi
- Vaishno Devi
- Vajreshwari
- Vakula Devi
- Valli
- Varahi
- Varuni
- Vasavi Kanyaka Parameswari
- Vijayadurga
- Vinata
- Vinayaki
- Vindhyavasini
- Yamuna
- Yogini

Korean

- Cheuksin
- Eopsin
- Gongsim
- Jowangsin
- Lady Saso
- Mago Halmi
- Samsin Halmoni
- Seonangsin
- Sosamsin
- Sungmo
- Teojusin
- Ungnyeo
- Yuhwa

Meitei

- Leimarel Sidabi
- Haoreima
- Ichum Lairembi
- Imoinu
- Irai Leima
- Keithel Lairembi
- Khunu Leima
- Khamnung Kikoi Louonbi
- Koiren Leima
- Konthong Lairembi
- Konthoujam Tampha Lairembi
- Korou Nongmai Hanpi
- Koubru Namoinu
- Koujeng Leima
- Kounu
- Laikhurembi
- Lainaotabi
- Loktak Ima
- Macha Ibemma Khudithibi
- Market goddesses
- Namungbi
- Ngaleima
- Nganu Leima
- Nungthel Leima
- Nongthang Leima
- Panthoibi
- Phouoibi
- Shangnu
- Shapi Leima
- Thongak Lairembi
- Thumleima
- Yumjao Leima
- Yenakha Paotapi

Ob-Ugrian

- Golden Woman
- Kaltes-Ekwa
- Khaltesh-Anki
- Zonget

Satsana Phi

- Nang Kwak
- Nang Ta-khian
- Nang Tani
- Phosop
- Phra Mae Ya

Shinto

- Akinagatarashi-hime
- Amanozako
- Amaterasu
- Amazake-babaa
- Ame-no-Uzume
- Daikokutennyo
- Gigeiten
- Haniyasu-hime
- Hashihime
- Inari Ōkami
- Isukeyori-hime
- Iwanaga-hime
- Izanami
- Kamimusubi
- Kayano-hime
- Konohanasakuya-hime
- Kukuri-hime
- Kushinada-hime
- Nakisawame
- Saho-hime
- Tamakushi-hime
- Tamayori-hime
- Toyotama-hime
- Toyouke-hime
- Ugajin
- Ukemochi
- Wakahirume

Tengrism

- Abzar Ana
- Ak Ana
- Altan Telgey
- Chesma iyesi
- Etugen Eke
- Gun Ana
- Kubai
- Luwr
- Manzan Gurme Toodei
- Od iyesi
- Su iyesi
- Szélanya
- Umay
- Yalchuk
- Yel Ana
- Yer Ana and Yereh
- Yer Tanrı

Vietnamese

- Âu Cơ
- Bà Chúa Kho
- Bà Chúa Xứ
- Bà mụ
- Lady Triệu
- Trưng Sisters
- Liễu Hạnh
- Mẫu Địa Phủ
- Mẫu Thoải
- Mẫu Thượng Ngàn
- Mẫu Thượng Thiên
- Quán Thế Âm
- Thiên Y A Na
- Thứ phi Hoàng Phi Yến
- Phật Mẫu Man Nương
- Ỷ Lan
- Phạm Thị Trân
- Quan họ

Other

- Aisyt (Yakut)
- Amamikyu (Ryukyuan)
- Anapel (Koryak)
- Bai Baianai (Yakut)
- Bugady Musun (Evenki)
- Chachy (Itelmen)
- Disani (Nuristani)
- Kayin Maunghnama (Karen)
- Karumariamman (Tamil)
- Lady Po Nagar (Cham)
- Mariamman (Tamil)
- Oladevi (Bengali)
- Sarna Burhi (Munda and Kurukh)
- Seetla Mata (Punjabi)
- Seolmundae Halmang (Jejuan)
- Shui Wei Sheng Niang (Hainanese)
- Shwe Kyunbin Maunghnama (Shan)
- Susin (Goguryeo)
- Tomam (Ket)
- Yang Asha (Hmong)
- Yeongdeung Halmang (Jejuan)

== European goddesses ==
Albanian

- Dheu
- E Bukura e Dheut
- E Bukura e Detit
- Fatia
- Hena
- Nëna e Diellit
- Nëna e Vatrës
- Ora
  - Bardha
- Prende
- Zana

Baltic

- Laima
- Lauma
- Percunatele
- Saulė

Baltic Finnic

- Ajatar
- Hongatar
- Ilmatar
- Linda
- Kalma
- Kareitar
- Kave
- Kuu
- Maaemä
- Louhi
- Loviatar
- Mielikki
- Päivätär
- Rauni
- Syöjätär
- Tellervo
- Tuonetar
- Tuulikki
- Vammatar
- Ved-ava
- Vellamo

Basque

- Aide
- Amalur
- Artahe
- Ekhi
- Ilargi
- Lurbira
- Mari

Celtic

- Abnoba
- Acionna
- Adsullata
- Aerfen
- Agrona
- Albina
- Ancamna
- Ancasta
- Andarta
- Andraste
- Annea Clivana
- Arentius and Arentia
- Arduinna
- Arnemetia
- Artio
- Aveta
- Ataegina
- Bandua
- Belisama
- Bergusia
- Bormana
- Bricta
- Brigantia
- Cathubodua
- Clota
- Coventina
- Damona
- Dea Matrona
- Dea nutrix
- Divona
- Epona
- Erecura
- Glaistig
- Gontia
- Hafren
- Ianuaria
- Icaunis
- Icovellauna
- Inciona
- Iouga
- Latis
- Les Lavandières
- Litavis
- Nabia
- Nantosuelta
- Naria
- Nemetona
- Onuava
- Ricagambeda
- Ritona
- Rosmerta
- Satiada
- Senuna
- Sequana
- Sirona
- Souconna
- Suleviae
- Sulis
- Trebaruna
- Trebopala
- Verbeia
- Vesunna
- Xulsigiae

Etruscan

- Alpanu
- Artume
- Athrpa
- Catha
- Cel
- Ethausva
- Horta
- Lasa
- Latva
- Leinth
- Losna
- Mania
- Menrva
- Metaia
- Medusa
- Nurtia
- Persipnei
- Semla
- Thalna
- Thesan
- Thethis
- Turan
- Uni
- Vanth
- Vegoia

Germanic

- Alaisiagae
- Baduhenna
- Elder Mother
- Frau Minne
- Frijjō
- Hariasa
- Hludana
- Holda
- Nehalennia
- Nerthus
- Rheda
- Sandraudiga
- Sinthgunt
- Sol
- Tamfana
- Vagdavercustis
- Zisa

Greek

- Aceso
- Achelois
- Achlys
- Adephagia
- Adikia
- Adrestia
- Aegiale
- Aegle
- Aergia
- Aidos
- Alala
- Alcyone
- Algea
- Amechania
- Amphictyonis
- Amphillogiai
- Amphitrite
- Anaideia
- Ananke
- Androktasiai
- Angelia
- Angelos
- Antheia
- Aoide
- Apate
- Aphaea
- Aphrodite
- Apollonis
- Aporia
- Arae
- Arche
- Arete
- Ariadne
- Arke
- Artemis
- Aspalis
- Asteria
- Astraea
- Astrape
- Atë
- Athena
  - Anemotis
  - Itonia
- Aura
- Auxesia
- Azesia
- Baubo
- Benthesikyme
- Bia
- Borysthenis
- Brimo
- Britomartis
- Brizo
- Calliope
- Calypso
- Carme
- Caryatis
- Celaeno
- Cephisso
- Ceto
- Charites
  - Aglaea
  - Charis
  - Euphrosyne
  - Kale
  - Thalia (Grace)
- Chrysothemis
- Circe
- Cleta
- Clio
- Corcyra
- Cynosura
- Daphne
- Demeter
- Despoina
- Dia
- Dindymene
- Dione
- Doris
- Dryad
  - Dryope
  - Epimeliad
  - Erato (dryad)
  - Eurydice
  - Hamadryad
    - Chrysopeleia
  - Meliae
  - Oread
    - Cyllene
    - Echo
    - Nomia
    - Pitys
- Dysnomia
- Dyssebeia
- Eileithyia
- Eiresione
- Ekecheiria
- Electra
- Electryone
- Eleutheria
- Elpis
- Enodia
- Enyo
- Eos
- Epione
- Erato
- Erinyes
  - Alecto
  - Megaera
  - Tisiphone
- Eris
- Ersa
- Eucleia
- Eukarpia
- Eunostus
- Eupheme
- Euporie
- Eupraxia
- Eurydome
- Eurynome
- Euterpe
- Euthenia
- Gaia
- Galene
- Genetyllides
- Graeae
- Harmonia
- Hebe
- Hecate
- Hegemone
- Heimarmene
- Helen of Troy
- Heliades
- Helike
- Hemera
- Hera
- Hesperis
- Hestia
- Hippeia
- Homonoia
- Horae
  - Acte
  - Anatole
  - Arctus
  - Auge
  - Dike
  - Dysis
  - Eirene
  - Elete
  - Eunomia
  - Gymnastica
  - Hesperis
  - Mesembria
  - Musica
  - Nymphe
  - Pherusa
  - Sponde
- Horme
- Hygieia
- Hypate
- Hysminai
- Iaso
- Ichnaea
- Ida
- Idyia
- Iphimedia
- Iris
- Kakia
- Kalligeneia
- Kallone
- Keres
- Kourotrophos
- Kotys
- Lampad
- Lampetia
- Lampsace
- Lethe
- Leto
- Libya
- Limos
- Litae
- Lyssa
- Machai
- Maia
- Maniae
- Melete
- Melinoë
- Melpomene
- Mene
- Merope (Pleiades)
- Mese
- Methe
- Metis
- Mneme
- Mnemosyne
- Moirai
  - Clotho
  - Lachesis
- Muses
- Nemesis
- Nephele
- Nesoi
- Nete
- Nike
- Nyx
- Oenone
- Oenotropae
- Oizys
- Opera
- Palioxis
- Pallas
- Panacea
- Pandia
- Pasikrata
- Pasiphaë
- Pasithea
- Peitharchia
- Peitho
- Penia
- Pepromene
- Persephone
- Phaenna
- Pheme
- Philophrosyne
- Philotes
- Phoebe
- Phoebe
- Phrike
- Pistis
- Planē
- Poena
- Polyhymnia
- Potamides
- Potnia Theron
- Praxidike
- Proioxis
- Prophasis
- Ptocheia
- Rhapso
- Rhea
- Rhodos
- Salmacis
- Selene
- Sterope
- Styx
- Taygete
- Terpsichore
- Thalia
- Thalia
- Theia
- Thelxinoë
- Themis
- Tyche
- Urania

Irish

- Aibell
- Áine
- Aimend
- Airmed
- Anu
- Arianrhod
- Banba
- Bé Chuille
- Beag
- Bébinn
- Beira
- Boann
- Branwen
- Brigid
- Cailleach
- Ceridwen
- Cethlenn
- Clíodhna
- Creiddylad
- Creirwy
- Cyhyraeth
- Cymidei Cymeinfoll
- Danu
- Dôn
- Ériu
- Ernmas
- Étaín
- Ethniu
- Fand
- Flidais
- Fódla
- Fuamnach
- Gaillimh inion Breasail
- Hag of Beara
- Lí Ban
- Medb
- Medb Lethderg
- Modron
- Mongfind
- Mór Muman
- Morrigan
  - Badb
  - Macha
  - Nemain
- Penarddun
- Rhiannon
- Scáthach
- Tailtiu
- Tlachtga

Lithuanian

- Aušrinė
- Birutė
- Dalia
- Gabija
- Medeina
- Milda
- Žemyna

Norse

- Álfröðull
- Angrboða
- Askafroa
- Astrild
- Aurboða
- Bestla
- Beyla
- Brunhild
- Eir
- Elli
- Fjörgyn
- Freyja
- Frigg
- Fulla
- Gefjon
- Geiravör
- Gerðr
- Gersemi
- Gjálp and Greip
- Gná and Hófvarpnir
- Göndul
- Gullveig
- Gunnr
- Hamingja
- Hel
- Herfjötur
- Herja
- Hervör alvitr
- Hildr
- Hlaðguðr svanhvít
- Hlín
- Hlökk
- Hnoss
- Iðunn
- Ilmr
- Járnsaxa
- Jörð
- Kára
- Laufey
- Lofn
- Mist
- Móðguðr
- Nanna
- Nine Daughters of Ægir and Rán
- Nine Mothers of Heimdallr
- Njörun
- Norns
- Nótt
- Ölrún
- Rådande
- Rán
- Rindr
- Roskva
- Róta
- Sága
- Sif
- Sigrdrífumál
- Sigrún
- Sigyn
- Sjöfn
- Skaði
- Skögul and Geirskögul
- Skuld
- Slattenpatte
- Snotra
- Sváfa
- Syn
- Þökk
- Þorgerðr Hölgabrúðr and Irpa
- Þrúðr
- Urðr
- Vár
- Verðandi
- Vör

Roman

- Abundantia
- Acca Larentia
- Aequitas
- Aeternitas
- Agenoria
- Angerona
- Anna Perenna
- Annona
- Antevorta
- Arachne
- Aurora
- Bellona
- Bona Dea
- Britannia
- Bubona
- Caca
- Camenae
- Candelifera
- Cardea
- Carmenta
- Ceres
- Cinxia
- Clementia
- Cloacina
- Concordia
- Cuba
- Cunina
- Cura
- Dea Dia
- Dea Tacita
- Decima
- Deverra
- Di nixi
- Diana
- Dies
- Disciplina
- Domiduca
- Edesia
- Egeria
- Empanda
- Fauna
- Faustitas
- Febris
- Fecunditas
- Felicitas
- Ferentina
- Fides
- Flora
- Fornax
- Fortuna
- Fortuna Huiusce Diei
- Fortuna Redux
- Fortuna Virilis
- Fraus
- Fulgora
- Furrina
- Gallia
- Hersilia
- Hippona
- Iana
- Intercidona
- Invidia
- Iustitia
- Juno
- Juturna
- Juventas
- Laetitia
- Larentina
- Laverna
- Levana
- Libera
- Liberalitas
- Libertas
- Libitina
- Lima
- Lua
- Lucina
- Luna
- Lympha
- Magna Dea
- Maia
- Mana Genita
- Mater Larum
- Mater Matuta
- Meditrina
- Mefitis
- Mellona
- Mens
- Minerva
- Molae
- Moneta
- Morta
- Murcia
- Nascio
- Nerio
- Nona
- Ops
- Orbona
- Palatua
- Pales
- Parcae
- Partula
- Patelana
- Paventia
- Pax
- Pellonia
- Pomona
- Postverta
- Potina
- Prorsa Postverta
- Proserpina
- Providentia
- Pudicitia
- Puta
- Querquetulanae
- Quiritis
- Robigo
- Roma
- Rumina
- Rusina
- Salacia
- Securitas
- Semonia
- Sentia
- Silvanae
- Spes
- Stata Mater
- Stimula
- Strenua
- Suadela
- Tempestas
- Terra
- Tranquillitas
- Trivia
- Tutela
- Tutelina
- Ultio
- Vacuna
- Vallonia
- Venilia
- Venus
- Venus Castina
- Venus Verticordia
- Veritas
- Vesta
- Vica Pota
- Victoria
- Viriplaca
- Virtus
- Volumna
- Volutina

Sami

- Beaivi
- Biejjenniejte
- Jábmiidáhkká
- Juoksáhkká
- Mano
- Máttaráhkká
- Raedieahkka
- Rana Niejta
- Sáráhkká
- Uksáhkká

Scythian

- Artimpasa
- Snake-Legged Goddess
- Tabiti

Slavic

- Baba Yaga
- Devana
- Kikimora
- Kostroma
- Lada
- Malakhitnitsa
- Marzanna
- Mat Zemlya
- Mokosh
- Moryana
- Ognyena Maria
- Poludnica
- Rusalka
- Samodiva
  - Vila
- Vesna
- Živa
- Zorya

Thracian

- Bendis
- Iambadoule
- Kotys

Other

- Aminon (Ossetian)
- Angitia (Umbrian)
- Anjana (Cantabrian)
- Bird goddess (Vinca material culture)
- Cupra (Umbrian)
- Dheghom (Proto-Indo-European)
- Dzerassae (Ossetian)
- Ēostre (Anglo-Saxon)
- Feronia (Sabine)
- Hausos (Proto-Indo-European)
- Māra (Latvian)
- Mother Nature (New Age)
- Nuit (Thelema)
- Perchta (Alpine)
- Reitia (Veneti)
- Triple Goddess (Wiccan)
- Tusholi (Vainakh)
- Ursitoare (Romanian)
- Ursitory (Romani)
- Vacuna (Sabine)

== Middle Eastern goddesses ==
Abrahamic

- Heavenly Mother
- Holy Spirit is feminine for some Christians
- Lilith
- Shekinah
- Sophia

Akkadian/Assyrian/Babylonian

- Anna
- Annunitum
- Antu
- Ashnan
- Aya
- Belet-Ili
- Belet-Seri
- Belet-Šuḫnir and Belet-Terraban
- Dimmeku
- Gazbaba
- Ḫabūrītum
- Išartu
- Ishtar
- Ishtarat
- Kakka
- Kippatmati
- Kishar
- Kitītum
- Kittum
- Lagamal
- Lamashtu
- Laṣ
- Mami
- Mamitu
- Meme
- Mullissu
- Ninḫinuna
- Ninkarrak
- Ninmeurur
- Sarpanit
- Šarrāḫītu
- Šassūrātu
- Šerua
- Siduri
- Tashmetum
- Tiamat
- Uṣur-amāssu

Anatolian

- Ala
- Ammamma
- Anzili
- Eštan
- Ḫalki
- Ḫannaḫanna
- Hanwasuit
- Ḫapantali
- Hatepuna
- Hipta
- Ḫuwaššanna
- Inara
- Istustaya and Papaya
- Iyaya
- Kamrusepa
- Kataḫḫa
- Kataḫzipuri
- Kuwannaniya
- Lamassu
- Lelwani
- Maliya
- Mezulla
- Mise
- Wurusemu

Arabian

- al-Lat
- Al-‘Uzzá
- Baltis
- Manaf
- Manāt
- Nā'ila
- Nuha
- Suwa'

Armenian

- Anahit
- Astghik
- Nane
- Spandaramet
- Nar

Canaanite

- Arsay
- Asherah
- Ashima
- Astarte
- Atargatis
- Chemosh
- Dadmiš
- Kotharat
- Pidray
- Shapash
- Shatiqatu
- Tallay

Egyptian

- Aati
- Abaset
- Ammit
- Amunet
- Anput
- Anuket
- Arsinoe II
- Bastet
- Bat
- Eye of Ra
- Hauhet
- Hathor
- Hatmehit
- Hedetet
- Hemsut
- Henet
- Heqet
- Hesat
- Horea
- Iabet
- Iat
- Imentet
- Ipy
- Isis
- Iunit
- Iusaaset
- Kauket
- Kebechet
- Khensit
- Maat
- Mafdet
- Mehet-Weret
- Mehit
- Menhit
- Meret
- Meretseger
- Meskhenet
- Mut
- Nebethetepet
- Nebtu
- Nebtuwi
- Nefertȧry
- Nehmetawy
- Neith
- Nekhbet
- Nephthys
- Neper
- Nu
- Nut
- Qetesh
- Pakhet
- Perit
- Raet-Tawy
- Renenutet
- Renpet
- Repyt
- Satis
- Sekhmet
- Serket
- Seshat
- Shesmetet
- Sopdet
- Ta-Bitjet
- Taweret
- Tayt
- Tefnut
- Tenenet
- Unut
- Wadjet
- Wepset
- Werethekau
- Wosret

Elamite

- Kiririsha
- Manzat
- Narundi
- Pinikir

Georgian

- Adgilis Deda
- Ainina and Danina
- Dali
- Lamaria
- Samdzimari
- Tamar

Hurrian

- Adamma
- Allani
- Ayu-Ikalti
- Barama
- Belet Nagar
- DINGIR.GE_{6}
- Hebat
- Hutena and Hutellura
- Išḫara
- Kubaba
- Lelluri
- Nabarbi
- Nikkal
- Ninatta and Kulitta
- Pentikalli
- Shala
- Shalash
- Shaushka
- Shuwala
- Takitu
- Uršui

Iranian

- Ahurani
- Ameretat
- Anahita
- Ardoksho
- Arshtat
- Ashi
- Bushyasta
- Chista
- Daena
- Drvaspa
- Haurvatat
- Jahi
- Nana
- Spenta Armaiti
- Zarik

Sumerian

- Ama-arḫuš
- Amasagnudi
- Aruru
- Azimua
- Bau
- Belili
- Bilulu
- Bizilla
- Damgalnuna
- Dumuzi-abzu
- Duttur
- Ereshkigal
- Ezina
- Gatumdag
- Geshtinanna
- Gula
- Gunura
- Hegir-Nuna
- Hušbišag
- Imzuanna
- Inanna
- Kanisurra
- Ki
- Kusu
- Lammašaga
- Lisin
- Ma
- Mamu
- Manungal
- Nammu
- Nanaya
- Nanshe
- Nisaba
- Ninegal
- Nineigara
- Ningal
- Ningikuga
- Ningirida
- Ningirima
- Ninhursag
- Ninigizibara
- Ninimma
- Ninirigal
- Ninisina
- Ninkasi
- Ninkurra
- Ninlil
- Nin-MAR.KI
- Ninmena
- Ninmug
- Ninnibru
- Ninniĝara
- Ninpumuna
- Ninšar
- Ninshubur
- Ninsianna
- Ninsikila
- Ninsun
- Ninti
- Nintinugga
- Ninura
- Nunbarsegunu
- Siris
- Shuzianna
- Urash
- Urnunta-ea
- Uttu

Urartian

- Arubani
- Bagmasti
- Selardi
- Tushpuea

Other

- Adrasteia (Phrygian)
- Anat (Amorite)
- Ba'alat Gebal (Phoenician)
- Chaabou (Nabatean)
- Cybele (Phrygian)
- Dhat-Badan (Himyarite)
- Ma (Cappadocian)
- Poppy goddess (Minoan)
- Satanaya (Caucasian)
- Seated Woman of Çatalhöyük
- Shams (Himyarite)
- Shumaliya (Kassite)
- Snake Goddess (Minoan)

== Oceanian goddesses ==
Gamilaraay

- Birrahgnooloo
- Ganhanbili
- Mingarope
- Yhi

Filipino

- Bakunawa
- Batibat
- Daragang Magayon
- Laon
- Magwayen
- Maria Cacao
- Maria Makiling
- Maria Sinukuan
- Mayari
- Tala

Indonesian Hindu

- Dewi Danu
- Dewi Lanjar
- Dewi Ratih
- Dewi Sri
- Nyai Roro Kidul
- Rangda
- Setesuyara

Hawaiian

- Haumea
- Hiiaka
- Hina-Lau-Limu-Kala
- Hina-puku-ia
- Hoohokukalani
- Kaohelo
- Kalamainuu
- Kapo
- Kihawahine
- Laka
- Mahina
- Nāmaka
- Nuakea
- Papahanaumoku
- Pele
- Poliahu
- Waka

Mangaian

- Papa
- Tu-metua
- Tumu-te-ana-oa
- Varima-te-takere

Māori

- Arohirohi
- Hineitapeka
- Hinekauataata
- Hinenuitepo
- Ikaroa
- Kohara
- Kui
- Mahuika
- Papa
- Whaitiri

Melanesian

- Abeguwo
- Abere
- Nevinbimbaau

Polynesian

- Atarapa
- Hina
- Hine-Tu-Whenua
- Ira
- Merau

Rapa Nui

- Atua-anua
- Hina-Oio
- Manana Take
- Riri-tuna-rai

Samoan

- Leutogi
- I'i
- Nafanua
- Sina
- Taema
- Tilafaiga

Tahitian

- Ai-tupuai
- Ihi
- Potii-ta-rire
- Rearea
- Taonoui
- Te-uri

Yolngu

- Djanggawul
- Julunggul
- Wala

Other

- Adi-mailagu (Fijian)
- Afek (Mountain Ok)
- Afekan (Tifalmin)
- Anjea (?)
- Atanua (Marquesan)
- Bila (Adnyamathanha)
- Dilga (Karajarri)
- Eingana (Jawoyn)
- Faumea (Tuamotu)
- Gnowee (Wergaia)
- Hainuwele (Alune)
- Hikuleʻo (Tongan)
- Ilaheva (Tongan)
- Kahausibware (Mono-Alu)
- Karatgurk (Wurundjeri)
- Kunapipi (Alawa)
- La'aka (Kwaio)
- Lewalevu (Fijian)
- Ligobubfanu (Trukese)
- Mareikura (Tuamotu)
- Miru (Cook Islander)
- Nei Tituaabine (Kiribati)
- Rohe (Moriori)
- Silewe Nazarate (Nias)
- Sunan Ambu (Sundanese)
- Wuriupranili (Tiwi)

== Fictional goddesses ==
- Aradia
- Babalon
- Belldandy
- Haruhi Suzumiya
- Mystra
- Princess Longji
- Skuld
- Shub-Niggurath
- Takhisis
- Tiamat
- Urd

== National personifications ==
- Albania : Nëna Shqipëri
- Armenia : Mayr Hayastan
- Bangladesh : Bangamata
- Brazil : Efígie da República
- Cambodia : Neang Neak
- Finland : Suomi-neito
- France : Marianne
- Georgia : Kartlis Deda
- Germany : Germania
- Greece : Hellas
- Haiti : Ezili Dantor, Katrin
- Hungary : Lady of Hungaria
- Iceland : Fjallkona
- India : Bharat Mata
- Indonesia : Ibu Pertiwi
- Ireland : Éire, Banba, Cailleach, Fódla, Gráinne Mhaol, Hibernia, Kathleen Ni Houlihan
- Italy : Italia turrita
- Japan : Amaterasu
- Malta : Melita
- Mexico : China poblana, Nuestra Señora de Guadalupe
- Netherlands : Nederlandse Maagd
- New Zealand : Zealandia
- Norway : Kari Nordmann
- North Korea : Ungnyeo
- Philippines : María Clara
- Poland : Poland
- Portugal : Efígie da República
- Russia : Matushka Rossiya
- Serbia : Majka Srbija
- South Korea: Ungnyeo
- Spain : Alegoría de España
- Sweden : Moder Svea
- Switzerland : Helvetia
- United Kingdom : Britannia
- United States : Lady Liberty, Columbia
- Vietnam : Liễu Hạnh

== See also ==
- Lists of deities
- List of religions
- Androgynous and hermaphroditic deities
- Gods
