= Worry doll =

Traditional Guatemalan doll

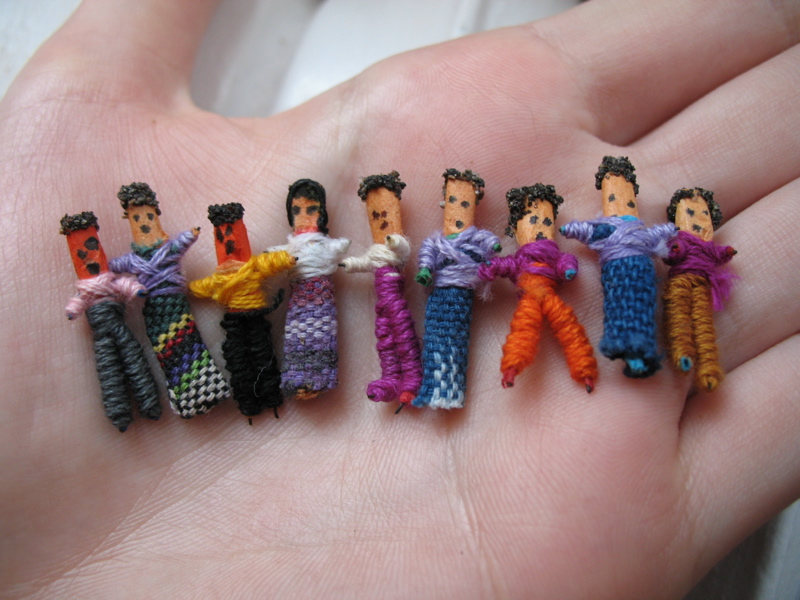
An assortment of worry dolls.

Worry dolls (also named trouble dolls; Spanish muñecas quitapenas) are small, mostly hand-made dolls that originate from the highland indigenous peoples of Guatemala.

== Description and material ==
Worry dolls are mostly hand-made. In Guatemala, they are made of wire, wool and colorful textile leftovers. The dolls are then dressed in traditional Mayan style. The size of the doll can vary between ½ inch and 2.0 inches. In western culture, the dolls are mostly made of pressed paper, adhesive tape, paper, and colorful wool. In Guatemala, the dolls can be remarkably larger in size.

== Function ==
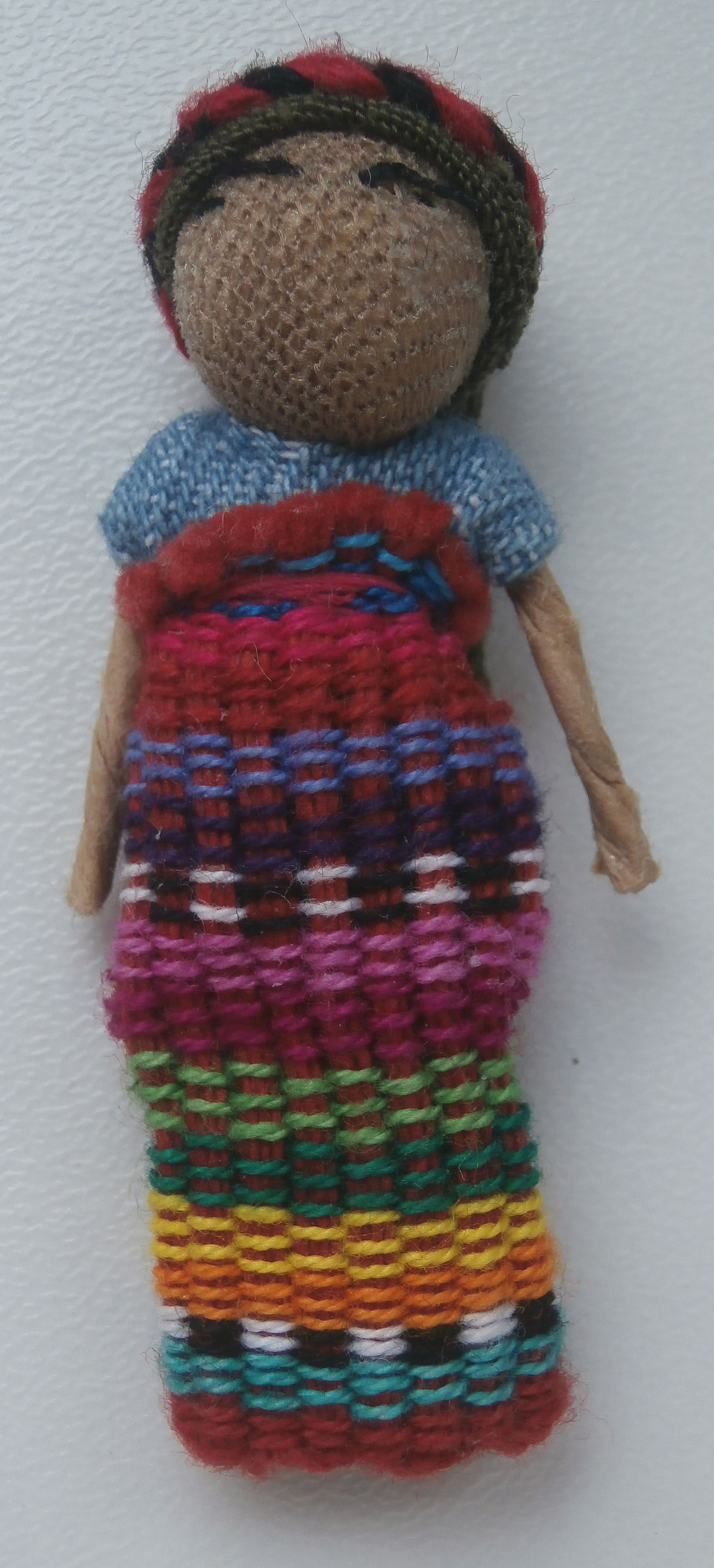
A worry doll in Guatemala

In the dolls' original Guatemalan tradition, a local legend about the origin of the Muñeca quitapena refers to a Maya princess named Ixmucane. The princess received a special gift from the sun god which would allow her to solve any problem a human could worry about.

In traditional and modern times, worry dolls are given or lent to brooding, anxious, or sorrowful children. They would tell their doll about their sorrows, fears and worries, then hide the doll under their pillow before going to sleep at night. It is said that the child relinquishes their worries to the dolls during the night and by the next morning, all sorrows are said to have been taken away by the worry doll and they can move forward refreshed the next day.

Worry dolls have also played a role in modern pediatrics and child psychiatry. During a psychological interview with children, some counselors have offered a worry doll to the child as some kind of imaginary, but trustworthy "listener", "allayer" and "contact person". The doll, in turn, will work for psychiatrists, psychologists, educators and parents as some kind of "agent" and "troubleshooter" between child and adult. Today, worry dolls are sold in huge quantity in Guatemala and Mexico. Nuns and poor children sell them to tourists as souvenirs. The dolls are quite popular since they are so small and thus easy to carry around.

== See also ==
- Guatemalan art
