= Aha Han =

God of animals in Turkic and Altai mythology

Aha Han is the god of animals in Turkic and Altai mythology. He is also referred to as Ahağa Han. He is believed to protect animals and is seen as the lord of animals, their master. The responsibility for wild animals and their offspring was entrusted to him by Ülgen. He is an expression of Turkic culture's view of humans as siblings with other living beings, animals, plants, and inanimate objects. He is also related to the river goddess Aha among the Yakuts and the Mother Goddess known as Aka in Anatolia.

== Etymology ==
It derives from the root (Ağ/Ah/Ak). Ağa/Aha means elder brother. It can be used to denote an older male sibling, or ownership. It also has connotations of whiteness. In Mongolian and Tungusic languages, it has been used historically and in contemporary times to define male-sided kinship. In Mongolian, "Ah" means brother, and in Manchu, "Ahon" means elder brother.
