= Luwr =

Luwr (or Luvr; Turkish: Lura, Hungarian: Búvár), is a legendary female animal in Turkic and Nivkh mythologies. It is the creator wildduck.

== In Creation Myths ==
In the Altai creation myth, in the beginning Earth emanated from Water. In ancient Turkish beliefs, Tangri (God) Kaira Khan is a pure, white goose that flies constantly over an endless expanse of water (time). But before Ak-Ana appears to urge Kaira Khan to create, he experiences a disturbance of his calm. From the bottom of the Water a "sacred duck" Lura lifted up the sand, clay and silt, from which the Earth was created. Water was the initial state of everything in existence.

In ancient Turkic beliefs, Tangri (God) Kara Han is a pure, white goose that flies constantly over an endless expanse of water (time). As a gander, Kara-han is lord of the three realms of air, water and land.

In Hungarian mythology, the sea duck is a spirit animal because ducks fly in the air and dive in the water. Thus ducks belong to both the upper world and the world below. The Sun takes the form of a golden diving-duck to retrieve the first living creatures from the bottom of the sea. Arany Atya asked the duck to bring up mud from below the water to create land. But she hid the mud in her mouth, and he was punished by having his legs broken so he could not walk.

== In Literature ==
Chinghiz Aitmatov in his book "Piebald Dog Running Along The Shore" told the story of Luvr, to be heard from Vladimir Sangi:

"In the beginning, the beginning of all beginnings, there was no land in nature, not even a grain of sand. There was water everywhere, nothing but water. (...) But Luvr the Duck, yes, that same commonplace broadbilled bird that sweeps over our heads in flocks to this very day, was flying at that time over the world all alone, and she had nowhere to lay an egg. There was nothing in the whole world but water, there weren't even any reeds with which to build a nest. (...) Then Luvr the Duck settled on the water, plucked the feathers from her breast and made her nest. And it was from that floating nest that the land began to form. Little by little the land spread outwards, little by little the earth was settled by all kinds of creatures."

== Sources ==
- Vladimir Sangi, Pesn'o nivkhakh. Moscow, Sovremennik, 1989
