= Keithel Lairembi =

Ancient Meitei goddess of commerce

- business, merchants, trades, market, commerce, trade, stock and fortune
- Member of Meitei deities
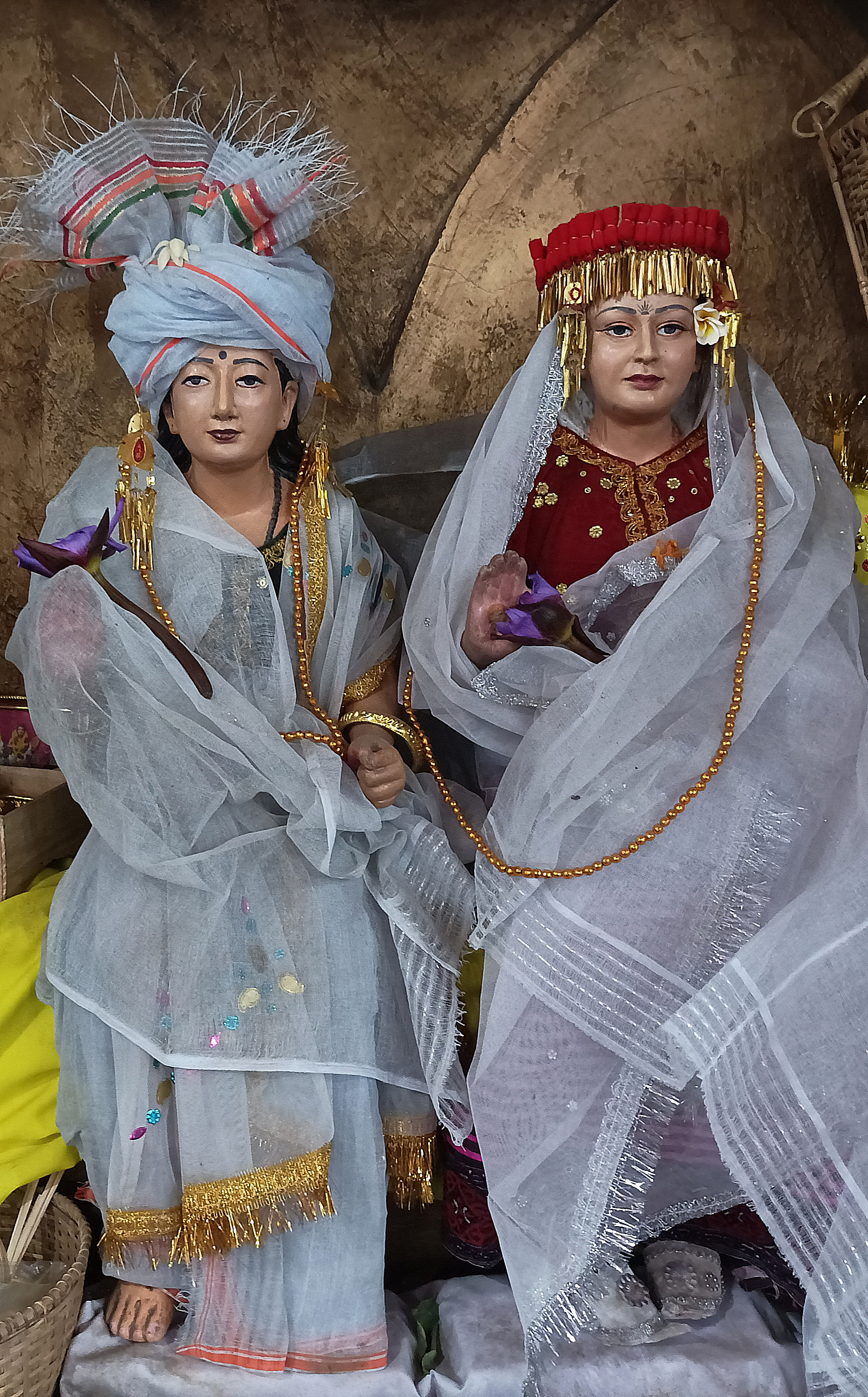
- Keithel Lairemba (Market God) & Keithel Lairembi (Market Goddess), the traditional Meitei deities of the Ima Keithel
- Other names: Keithen Lairembee
- Meitei: ꯀꯩꯊꯦꯜ ꯂꯥꯏꯔꯦꯝꯕꯤ
- Affiliation: Meitei mythology, folklore and religion of Sanamahism
- Major cult center: Ima Keithel & all the marketplaces of Imphal Valley
- Abode: marketplaces (Meitei: Keithel)
- Adherents: Meitei people
- Gender: female
- Region: Manipur
- Ethnic group: Meitei ethnicity
- Consort: Keithel Lairemba

Equivalents
- Greek: Tyche
- Hindu: Lakshmi
- Roman: Fortuna

Keithel Lairembi (ꯀꯩꯊꯦꯜ ꯂꯥꯏꯔꯦꯝꯕꯤ), also known as Keithen Lairembi (ꯀꯩꯊꯦꯟ ꯂꯥꯏꯔꯦꯝꯕꯤ), is an important goddess in old Meitei mythology, folklore and religion of Sanamahism. Meitei people believe she protects marketplaces (Meitei: Keithel) and the women who work there. Her male counterpart is known as Keithel Lairemba (ꯀꯩꯊꯦꯜ ꯂꯥꯏꯔꯦꯝꯕ). Their presence is notable in the Ima Keithel (mothers' market) in Imphal city, as well as in all the markets in the Imphal valley. They are related to market, commerce, trade, stock and fortune. The women who sell things in the market give small offerings every day to the deities to ask for blessings and a good day. These divinities are an important part of the living traditions of Khwairamband Keithel, especially in the Nupi Keithel (women's market).

== Beliefs ==
Keithel Lairembi was believed to watch over the people and the market’s success in Meitei civilization. Seen as a kind and powerful goddess, she would show signs of big troubles or disasters for the nation by appearing as a woman dressed in white, crying before dawn. People believed the market had a deep, hidden energy that reflected the fate of the whole nation of Kangleipak (modern day Manipur).

== Sculptures ==
The stone idol of Keithel Lairembi, the goddess of the market, was made in the early 1700s.

The statues of Keithel Lairembi near the peepal tree by the Nambul River were taken away, and new ones were placed inside the Ima Keithel (Mother’s Market).

== Religious activities ==
Holy and sacred ceremonies, rites and rituals are performed by priests in honour of the two deities, from time to time.

== Related goddesses ==
Keithel Lairembi is often considered as a divine manifestation of Phouoibi (goddess of paddy), Leimarel Sidabi (goddess of earth), Imoinu (goddess of wealth), Ponjel Leima (goddess of mercy), among other traditional Meitei deities in the Meitei pantheon. People believe that if market women say the name Ponjel Leima, while facing the rising sun, it helps them sell more and make good profits.

== See also ==
- Puthiba
- Women in Meitei civilisation
- Konthong Lairembi
- Konthoujam Tampha Lairembi
- Thongak Lairembi
- Ichum Lairembi
- Nongthang Lairembi
- Loktak Lairembi
- Yumjao Lairembi
- Hiyangthang Lairembi
