= Ambat =

Culture hero of the Melanesian mythology of Malekula Island, Vanuatu

In the Melanesian mythology of Malekula Island, Vanuatu, Ambat is a culture hero recorded by A.B. Deacon. In the myth, Temes Malau has an ogress wife Nevinbumbaau and had a son Mansip. Nevinbumbaau trapped Ambat's older brothers one after another in a ditch, where they stayed until Ambat came to free them. The same brothers later tried to kill Ambat because they envied him his beautiful wife Lindanda, who learned of her husband's death when she saw blood on the comb he had left her. She escaped from the brothers, who thought they had won (Bonnefoy 1993:96, 99, 103).

== See also ==
- Nevinbimbaau
