= Textoverdi =

Tribe of Celtic Britons

The Textoverdi (Common Brittonic: *Textowerdī) were a tribe of Celtic Britons whose name appears in the upper valley of the River South Tyne in present-day Northumberland. One scholar calls them one of the “shadowy peoples of Lower Britain.” The Textoverdi may have been a sub-tribe of the Brigantes, but according to Laurence and Berry, they could have been an independent group who originally paid tribute to stronger neighbours but then managed to establish their own independent relationship with the Romans.

In terms of archaeological evidence, there is an “enigmatic” altar of the 2nd or 3rd century that records a dedication to Satiada (Sattada), a local goddess. It was dedicated by the senate of the Textoverdi (curia Textoverdorum). The Textoverdi are believed to have been the inhabitants of an area, with their capital at Beltingham near the site of Vindolanda or at Corbridge.

One scholar states that “both the goddess and the people of the Textoverdi are otherwise unknown; and the exact meaning of curia is unclear, perhaps a latinization of a native British institution.”

Curia may not refer to a local senate, “but, as the Celtic corie, to a local subdivision of the tribe equivalent to a pagus. Thus the Textoverdi are perhaps a pagus of the Brigantes.”

The inscription reads:

DEAE / SAIIADAE / CVRIA TEX / TOVERDORVM / V•S•L•M
"To the goddess Satiada, the council of the Textoverdi willingly and deservedly fulfilled their vow."
