= Rhapso =

Goddess mentioned in an Athenian inscription

In Greek mythology, Rhapso (Ancient Greek: Ῥαψώ) was a nymph or a minor goddess worshipped at Athens. She is known solely from an inscription of the 4th century BCE, found at Phalerum. Her name apparently derives from the Greek verb ῥάπτω meaning "to sew" or "to stitch".

According to some, she is associated with the Moirai (as a fate goddess) and Eileithyia (as a birth goddess); she somehow organized a man's thread of life, at birth, by some sort of stitching work (similar to Clotho of the Moirai). And according to others, she was possibly a patroness of seamstresses.
