= Amazake-babaa =

Yōkai of Japan

Amazake-babaa (甘(あま)酒(ざけ)婆(ばばあ), "amazake hag") or amazake banbā is an old woman yōkai from the folklore of Miyagi and Aomori prefectures in Japan. She is rumored to come to the doors of houses late at night and call out “Might you have any amazake?" in a childlike voice, but if anyone answers they fall ill with either smallpox or the common cold. She was known as the goddess of smallpox in a time when smallpox ran rampant in Japan. It is said that to keep her away, a cedar branch is placed in the doorway. Mothers give offerings to amazake-babaa in order to prevent their children from falling ill. A key difference between Amazake-babaa and amazake banbā is that amazake banbā tries to sell amazake while Amazake-babaa asks if a person has any and a sign saying "we do not like sake or amazake" will keep amazake banbā away.

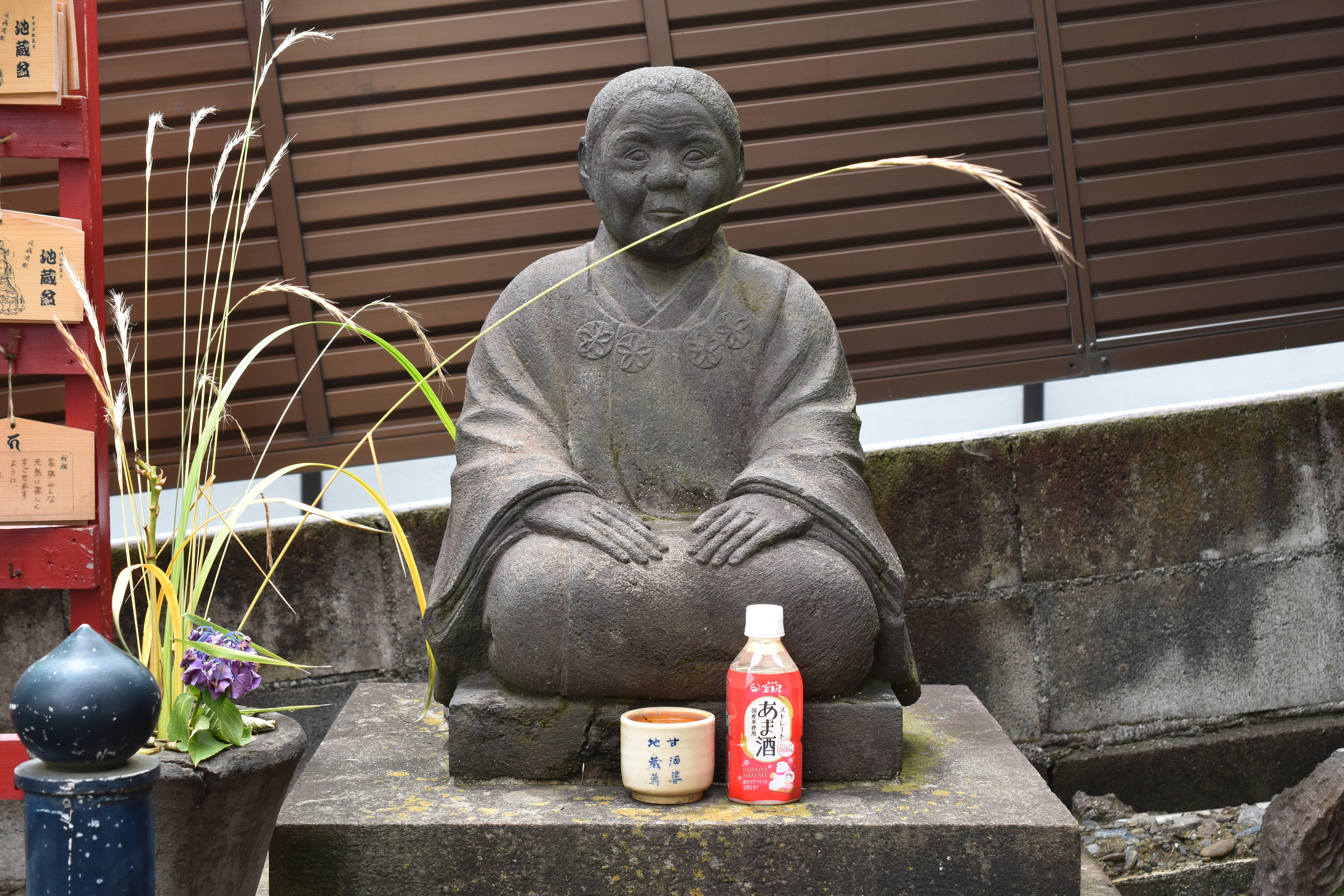
The statue of a deified Amazake-babaa in Tokyo.

A similar creature is known as the amazake-banbaa in the Yamanashi Prefecture. She tries to sell her sake and amazake door-to-door and will bring disease to those who answer. She will be repelled by a sign by the door that says "we do not like sake or amazake".

In the Kohinata neighborhood of Bunkyo City, Tokyo, Amazake-babaa is not a supernatural being but a human being from the neighborhood, a local amazake-seller who died of a common cold and was posthumously deified as a protector of children against diseases. A statue of her was later erected by the abbot of Nichirin-ji Temple.
