= Pyelepyin Maunghnama =

Burmese folklore spirits

Pyelepyin Maunghnama (Burmese: ပြေလည်ပြင်မောင်နှမ; lit. 'Pyelepyin siblings') are two traditional Burmese nats, named Saw Pha Thar and Saw Mya Thar.

== Legend ==
During the regin of the King Alaungsithu of Pagan, Saw Pha Thar and Saw Mya Thar were royal servants. The brother, Saw Pha Thar, was a royal umbrella bearer who would shieldthe sunlight by an umbrella for the King. The sister, Saw Mya Thar, was a royal concubine.

One day, King Alaungsithu was travelling around the country by his royal barge, the sunlight fell onto his face as the wind blew hard. Saw Pha Thar was sent to death penalty because King Alaungsithu thought that he was not dutiful.

Saw Mya Thar against the king when her brother was executed. The king was so furious that he also sent her to death penalty. After the death of siblings, both the brother and sister became nats and looks after the people who believe in them. Their local followers and worshippers believe that by honoring they will have a productive harvest, successful business, support to increase their crops and health.
