= Hine-Tu-Whenua =

Polynesian mythological goddess

In Polynesian mythology, Hine-Tu-Whenua is a kind and beneficent wind goddess. She was very helpful toward sailors and helped them reach their destinations safely. Hineitapapauta is considered her mother.
