= Te-uri =

Goddess of darkness in Tahitian mythology

Te-uri is the goddess of darkness in Tahitian mythology. She is the sister of the war god 'Oro.
