= Horror (mythology) =

Horror in Greek myth/drama

Horror is a daimon appearing only in Seneca's Oedipus.

== Etymology ==
Horror literally means shaking, trembling, and the feeling of horror. This meaning is shared by the word φρίκη (phríkē), which is used often in Ancient Greek tragedy.
