= Nevinbimbaau =

Nevinbimbaau (or Nevinbumbaau) is a goddess in the Melanesian mythology of Malekula Island, Vanuatu. Some descriptions call her an ogress while others seem to speak of her as simply a female figure. Her rituals involve a complicated story about her son Mansip, his two wives and their children, Nevinbimbaau's grandchildren. The ritual begins with actors operating large staffs topped with carved heads, like stick puppets, representing the grandchildren (the temes nevinbur). In the course of the ritual, some or all of the temes are destroyed, new ones are created, and at the end wooden effigies of Mansip and his two wives are speared and burned. The ritual's purpose may have been to initiate new members, and may have something to do with reincarnation or resurrection, since new temes are created after the old ones are destroyed (Poignant 1967).

In a myth from Malekula recorded by A.B. Deacon, the ogress Nevinbumbaau is the wife of Temes Malau; their son is Mansip. Nevinbumbaau trapped Ambat's older brothers one after another in a ditch, where they stayed until Ambat, a culture hero, came to free them (Bonnefoy 1993:99).

== Bibliography ==
- Bonnefoy, Yves, (ed). American, African, and Old European Mythologies Translated under the direction of Wendy Doniger. Chicago and London: University of Chicago Press, 1993.
- Poignant, Rosalyn. Oceanic Mythology. Hamlyn Publishing Group: 1967
