= Baltis =

Ancient Arabian goddess

Baltis was an ancient Arabian goddess. She was revered at Carrhae and identified with the planet Venus.

Isaac of Antioch mentions Baltis in a text written in the middle of the 5th century CE as a deity worshipped by the Arabs. Baltis here is equivalent to Ishtar (Inanna), an ancient Mesopotamian goddess.

== See also ==
- Beltis
- Religion in pre-Islamic Arabia
