= Riri-tuna-rai =

Coconut goddess of Easter Island

Riri-tuna-rai is the goddess of the coconut in the mythology of Easter Island. She is married to Atua-metua.
