= Tootega =

Inuit deity

In Inuit mythology, Tootega is a wisened old goddess, able "to dispense with kayaks, umiaks and other craft," as well as walk on water. She is depicted as a small, elderly woman who lived on an island in a stone hut.
