= Budhi Pallien =

In Hinduism, Budhi Pallien (pronounced BOO-dee PAL-ee-en) is a fearsome goddess of forests and jungles, who roams northern India, particularly Assam, in the form of a tiger. This wise goddess can change shape, from human to feline form and often travels with a companion tiger as she protects animals, with which she communicates.
