= Khemukhi =

Khemukhi is the name of one of the 64 yoginis, which was a secret and esoteric female cult between the 9th and 13th century. In Hinduism, the term yogini refers to a female yogi in general, but the term 64 yoginis refers to a tantric and secret female cult worshiping Hindu Goddess Durga. Khemukhi is the goddess whose broken statue is found in the 64 yogini temple in Bhedaghat in the Jabalpur District in India. Her name is most probably derived from Khe - In The Sky and mukhi - faced.

In the 64 yogini temple in Bhedaghat there are more than 64 goddesses, so the number 64 is not always related to the actual number of yoginis (goddesses), but rather to a religious mystical meaning expressed in the number 64.

The information on 64 yoginis (goddesses) is very little and it is very hard to say what they accomplished, as this cult used a form of communication impenetrable for outsiders known as twilight language. 64 yoginis believed that by various practices (black magic, too) they could achieve immense supernatural powers. Their temples are roofless. This particular aspect shows that in their religious practices and thinking they did not follow the orthodox Brahmanic paths.
