= Adephagia =

Figure with a temple in Sicily

Adephagia (/ædiˈfeɪdʒiə/, Ancient Greek: Ἀδηφαγία) was a figure described as having a temple in Sicily. According to Claudius Aelianus's Varia Historia and a fragment of Polemon, nearby her temple was a statue of Demeter Sitō ('Goddess of Grain'). According to Konrad Wernicke, she was the personification of "abundant satiety" and a form of Demeter.
