= Market goddesses =

Ancient Meitei goddesses

- Member of Lairembis
- Other names: Keithen Kabi Lairembising
- Affiliation: Sanamahism
- Abode: marketplaces
- Texts: Khamnung Engal Leishaba Puya
- Gender: Female
- Region: Manipur
- Ethnic group: Meitei

Market goddesses or merchant goddesses (Meitei: Keithel Kabi Lairembising, Old Manipuri: Keithel Kapi Lailempising) are the goddesses known for keeping different market shops in Meitei mythology and religion Sanamahism, the indigenous religion of Manipur. Different sources have different answers to how many shopkeeping goddesses there are. They are Cheng Leima, Chinga Leima, Heipok Leima, Hei Leima, Laa Leima, Phu Leima, Pishum Leima, Thangching Leima, Waisheng Leima, Waithou Leima and Waal Leima.

== List ==
Name	Selling items
Cheng Leima (Meitei: ꯆꯦꯡ ꯂꯩꯃ, lit. 'Goddess of rice')	rice
Chinga Leima (Meitei: ꯆꯤꯡꯉꯥ ꯂꯩꯃ, lit. 'Lady of Chinga')	cereals, legumes, vegetables
Chinga Leima (Meitei: ꯍꯩꯄꯣꯛ ꯂꯩꯃ, lit. 'Lady of Heipok')	iron tools, daggers, knives, scissors, ladles, tongs
Hei Leima (Meitei: ꯍꯩ ꯂꯩꯃ, lit. 'Goddess of fruit')	fruits and sweets
Laa Leima (Meitei: ꯂꯥ ꯂꯩꯃ, lit. 'Goddess of banana leaves')	banana leaves
Phu Leima (Meitei: ꯐꯨ ꯂꯩꯃ, lit. 'Goddess of pots')	pots and plates
Pishum Leima (Meitei: ꯄꯤꯁꯨꯝ ꯂꯩꯃ, lit. 'Lady of Pishum')	clothes for deities, belts, upper body clothing, gold and silver jewellery
Thangching Leima (Meitei: ꯊꯥꯡꯆꯤꯡ ꯂꯩꯃ, lit. 'Lady of Thangching')	taro, herbs, chili peppers, chives
Waisheng Leima (Meitei: ꯋꯥꯢꯁꯦꯡ ꯂꯩꯃ, lit. 'Waisheng Lady')	salt cakes
Waithou Leima (Meitei: ꯋꯥꯢꯊꯧ ꯂꯩꯃ, lit. 'Lady of Waithou')	edible oils
Waal Leima (Meitei: ꯋꯥꯜ ꯂꯩꯃ)	Lady associated with cooking, eating and kitchens

== See also ==
- Emoinu, Goddess of wealth and prosperity
- Phouleima, Goddess of agriculture, paddy and rice
