= Kahausibware =

Entity of Local Belief

Kahausibware is a serpentine female spirit and primeval creator goddess revered in the Solomon Islands. She was a Hi'ona—a powerful supernatural being who created the world.

According to myth, Kahausibware created pigs, cocoa-nut trees, and fruit trees. Having created food, she then created animals and humans to use it.
