= Sentia =

Sentia may be:

- Sentia gens, a family in ancient Rome
- Sentinus (male) or Sentina (female), Roman childhood deities
- The Mazda Sentia, an automobile
- Sentia Media, an Australian company, now rebranded as Isentia
- Sentia, an alcohol substitute

Sentía is the Spanish word "I/he/she felt".
