= Hina-puku-ia =

Hawaiian goddess of fishermen

- Goddess of fishermen
- Venerated in: Hawaiian religion
- Gender: Female

Hina-puku-ia is the goddess of fishermen in Hawaiian mythology.
