= Nesoi =

Ancient Greek goddesses of islands

The Nesoi (Greek Nῆσοι "islands"), in ancient Greek myth, were the personifications of islands.

According to Callimachus, the Ourea were destroyed by Poseidon and his trident during one of his rages, and when he cast the remains of the Ourea into the sea, they became the Nesoi.
