= Adi-mailagu =

Polynesian sky goddess of the Fijian people

Adi-mailagu is a Polynesian sky goddess of the Fijian people.

In Fijian mythology, Adi-mailagu is known as the "Lady of the Sky" or the "Goddess of the Sky". She was said to have come to earth in the form of a grey rat, descending from the sky and plunging into a river after being forced out of the heavens by Tuilakemba. She can also manifest herself as a maiden or an aging crone with a yard long tongue. She has also run an oracle service for priests
