= Sava (mythology) =

In the traditions of Samoa, Sava and his sister, I'i, were the children of Lefatu (the rock) and Le'ele'ele (the earth). They lived in Manu'a and became the first settlers of Savai'i.
