= Pasikrata =

Goddess worshipped in Thessaly

Pasikrata (Ancient Greek: Πασικράτα) was the name of a goddess worshiped as a local cult in certain places of Greece in classical and Hellenistic period. It has been assumed that it was a cult of a chthonic Aphrodite or Artemis. Sanctuaries of Pasikrata have been found in Demetrias (Thessaly) (from the 3rd century BC until at least the 2nd century AD), Ambrakia (Epirus) and in Heracleia (Macedonia). The latter had slaves and hierodouloi (sacred prostitutes) at its disposition.

The name is considered the female equivalent of Pankrates (omnipotent), attributed to Hercules.
