= Artahe =

Goddess

Artaha (also spelled Artehe) is the name of an ancient goddess that was worshiped in Southern Gaul, in the region of Aquitania. She is a tutelary goddess that is thought to be associated with bears.

The theonym is recorded in several inscriptions from Saint-Pé-d'Ardet, where there seems to have been a Gallo-Roman-era cult center for the god:

CIL 13, 64
Lexeia Odanni f(ilia) Artehe v(otum) s(olvit) l(ibens) m(erito)

CIL 13, 70; AE 1888, 141
Deo Artahe L(uci) P(ompei) Pauliniani [nep(os) 3]

ILTG 37
Artahe deo Rufo IIFIS v(otum) s(olvit) l(ibens) m(erito)

ILTG 38
[...] Artahe [...]

From the same region - the village of Lourde - comes another inscription bearing the name:

CIL 13, 71
Artehe deo Bonnexi Amandi v(otum) s(olvit) l(ibens) m(erito)

It is also recorded in an inscription from Malvezie:

CIL 13, 73 (4, p 2)
Ar[t]a[he deo] L(ucius) Antist(ius) Syntr[o]p(h)us v(otum) s(olvit) l(ibens) m(erito)

== Etymology ==
According to Spanish linguist and Vascologist Joaquín Gorrochategui, her name has been variously interpreted as either Celtic, related to Artaios, or Aquitanian. Following the second line of reading, the name appears to be of ancient Aquitanian origin and may be cognate with modern Basque arte "oak". The place name Ardet may be derived from the theonym, or vice versa.
