= Hine-i-Tapeka =

In Māori mythology, Hine-i-Tapeka or Tapeka is a goddess of underground fire. She is the sister of Hine-nui-te-pō and Mahuika, and her parents are given as Tāne or Makara and Rotua. According to Ngāti Awa legend, she pursued Māui after he had destroyed the Fire Children. According to Tākitimu, she hid her fire under the earth, where it became the origin of volcanic fire.
