= Vallonia (mythology) =

Roman goddess

In Roman mythology, Vallonia was the goddess of valleys (cf. Latin vallis "valley"). Her name is known from St. Augustine's work The City of God, and is not attested otherwise.
