= Dev Mogra =

Tribal deity worshipped by Bhil communities in western India

‘’‘Dev Mogra’’’ (also ‘’‘Devmogra’’’, ‘’‘Devmogi’’’, or ‘’‘Yaah Devmogi’’’) is a tribal deity revered primarily by the Bhil and related indigenous communities inhabiting the Satpura Range of western India. Dev Mogra is regarded as an ancestral and protective deity and forms part of the traditional religious and cultural practices of Bhil tribal communities in the regions of present-day Gujarat and Maharashtra.

The principal shrine dedicated to Dev Mogra is situated on a hill near Sagbara in Gujarat, India. According to local tradition, the shrine was established several generations ago following a vision experienced by a tribal priest.Gazetteer. Vol. 6. India: Government Central Press. 1880. p. 161.Tribhuwan, Robin David (2003). Fairs and Festivals of Indian Tribes. New Delhi: Discovery Pub. House. pp. 230–231. ISBN 8171416403.

An annual fair and pilgrimage associated with Dev Mogra is held between February and March, attracting several hundred thousand devotees, predominantly from Bhil and other tribal communities of the Satpura region.Tribhuwan, Robin David (2003). Fairs and Festivals of Indian Tribes. New Delhi: Discovery Pub. House. pp. 230–231. ISBN 8171416403.

== Cultural significance ==
Dev Mogra occupies an important place in the oral traditions, folklore, and ritual practices of Bhil communities. The deity is associated with tribal identity, ancestral heritage, and the sacred landscape of the Satpura hills.
