= Abere =

Abere is a demoness or mythical figure from Melanesian mythology. She is portrayed as a "wild" woman with young female servants, the relationship between her and her female servants has been interpreted as romantic or sexual by some scholars. She is said to reside in marshes. She draws people to her by her beauty, entrapping them by causing reeds to grow around them. Once they are trapped, she proceeds to devour her victims.

A second-hand account from 1914 \ shows a transcription of a song that claims that Abere is not a demoness but a shape shifting culture hero who taught people how to build and plant crops and keeps them from harm.

A separate story says that Abere created the first dugongs by pulling an infant into the water and transforming it before it drowned, causing the mother to follow and be transformed as well.
