= Khaltesh-Anki =

Siberian goddess of Earth

Khaltesh-Anki (also Kaltesh, Kaltes), 'Gold Woman', is an Ob-Ugrian goddess (of the Khanty and Mansi peoples), associated with childbirth, fertility, fate, and the earth

As a goddess of birth and fate, Kaltesh is responsible for a person's lifespan, and keeps a record book. She was believed to protect women in childbirth.

Kaltesh may have been the wife - or, in other variations of the story, the daughter or sister - of the god Nuri-Toorum. Kaltesh was the mother (or, depending on the legend, the aunt, or sister) of a key figure in myth, World-Surveyor Man.

== See also ==
- Golden Woman
- Kaltes-Ekwa
