= Zonget =

Zonget is a Mansi Nature Goddess.

Zonget was known as "mistress of herds", ruling over all birds, animals and the people that hunt them. Birds and animals would allow themselves to be trapped if she ordained it. Shamans of the hunting people still have to make offerings to her and make sure the creatures are treated with reverence or food supplies would cease. She appears to mortals in the form of a gray Arctic bird.
