= Ethausva =

Etruscan birth goddess

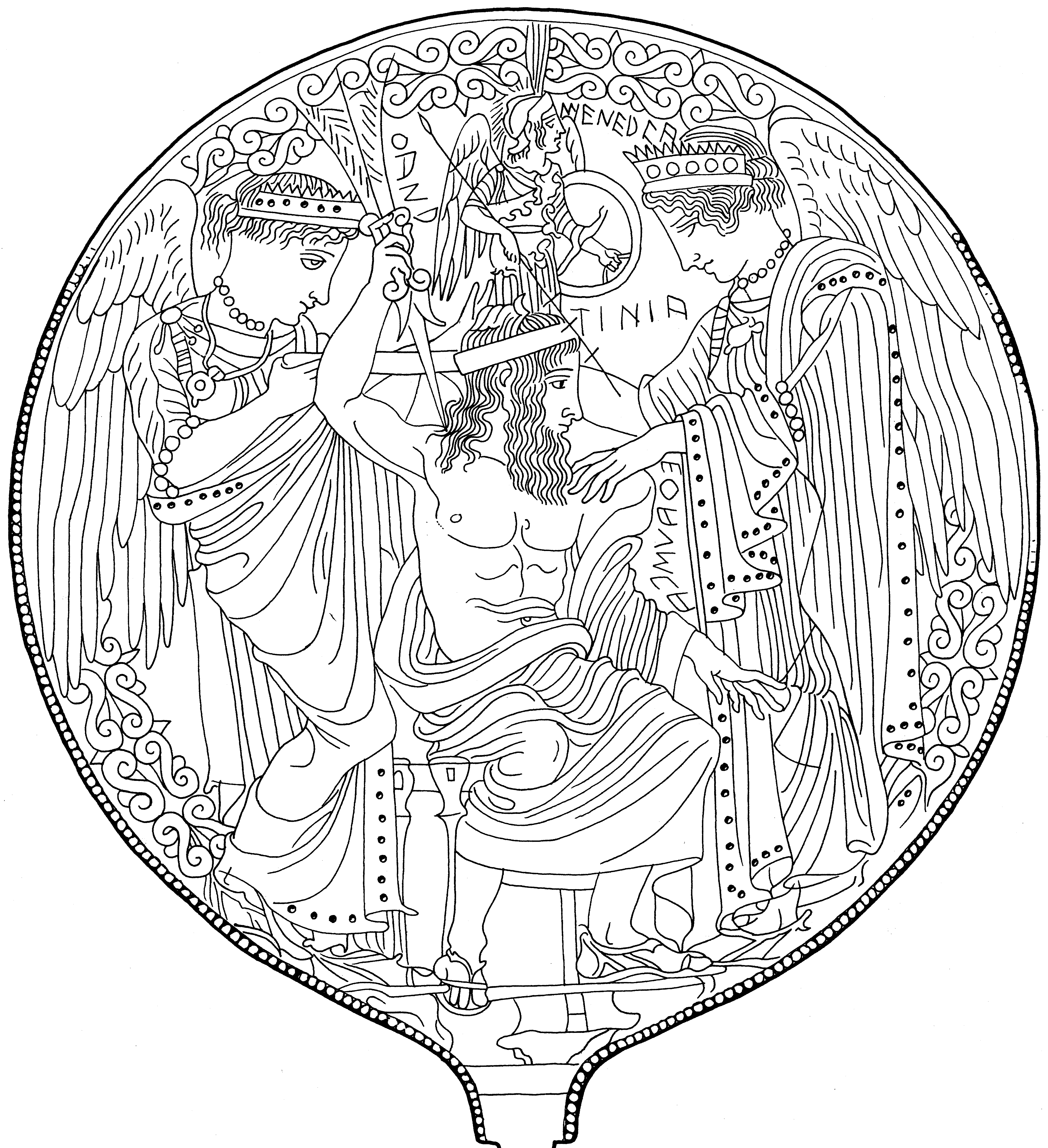
- Known for: Female birth deity

Ethausva is an Etruscan divine figure that appears in a few Etruscan inscriptions . She is depicted as a winged female richly robed and wearing a jeweled crown on her head. Her lack of mention on Etruscan artwork and inscriptions suggest that she was not very common, but she was considered canon to the Etruscan Pantheon so she was still known during the time of the Etruscans.

== Significance ==
It is not likely that Ethausva was a major figure in the religious practices of the Etruscans due to there being other deities that serve similar purposes, namely Thanr and Thalna. Thanr and Thalna are both goddesses who are attributed to birth. They both appear in several scenes on Etruscan Bronze Mirrors such as the birth of Fufluns and the presentation of Epiur, for Thalna, and the Birth of Menerva for Thanr. They were both clearly important and likely had a cult dedicated to them. There is not much evidence of there being a cult dedicated to Ethausva, however her name is included on the Bronze liver of Piacenza. This bronze diagram of a sheep liver has the names of many Etruscan deities etched onto it. They are either named in their entirety or named using a short hand. Ethausva's inclusion on this piece (pictured below at marker 5) is abbreviated as EO and could show that she had a cult status in Etruscan religious communities. Ethausva appears on the Liver with Thalna, but Thanr is not included. Thanr's association with Thalna that she is more visible in Etruscan art than Ethausva.

== Appearances in Etruscan art ==
Ethausva's only appearance in physical form is in the Bronze mirror from Praeneste, ca. 400-300 BCE. This mirror shows Ethausva being involved in the birth of Menerva (the Etruscan equivalent to Athena). In this scene, she is positioned to the right of Tinia (the Etruscan equivalent to Zeus). She is caressing his head with her right hand, and supporting him by his shoulder with her left hand. To the left of Tinia is Thanr. Thanr is another goddess attributed to child birth. She is bandaging up Tinia's head with her right hand and is holding up Menerva with her left. Menerva is positioned on top of Tinia. She is fully clothed wearinga robe, plumed helmet, and brandishing a shield. Menerva, Thanr, and Ethausva are all winged. Tinia is shown holding his iconic lightning bolt.

== Sources for Ethausva ==
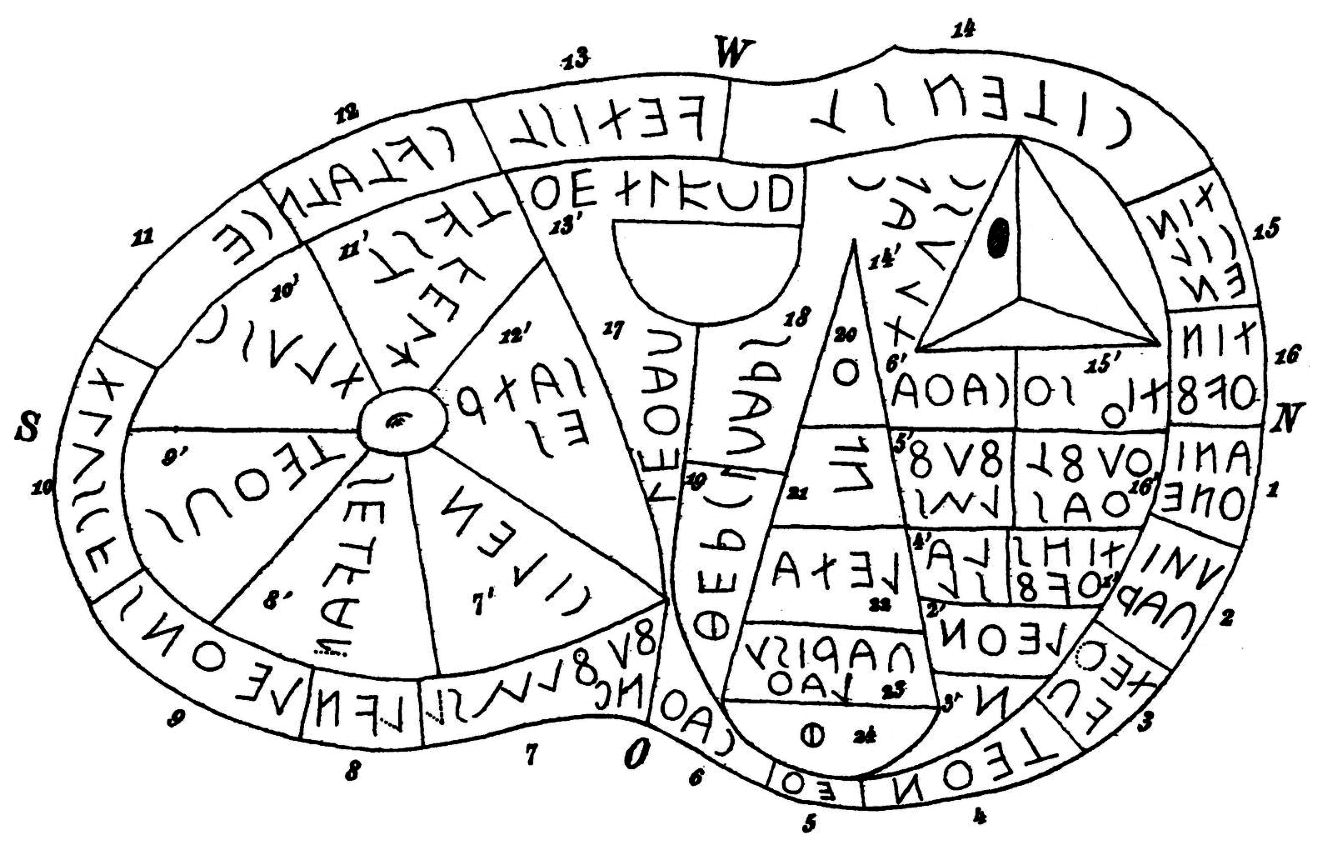
Inscription #5 "eθ" on bronze liver of Piacenza

Sources that mention Ethausva include the bronze mirror from Praenste. She is also mentioned on the bronze liver from Piacenza. The bronze mirror where she appears alongside Thanr, Tinia and Menerva show Ethausva as a midwife assisting in the birth of a child. This is depiction serves as evidence of her being attributed to childbirth. Her inclusion on the Bronze liver could mean that she did have a cult of followers. Being included on this artifact likely means that she was of some importance. However, there are some gods missing from the liver, like Aplu (the Etruscan equivalent to Apollo) and Artumes (the Etruscan equivalent to Artemis). These two gods definitely were important in Etruscan religion as they appear much more often than Ethausva. That could mean that the inclusion of Ethausva on the mirror was just a touch by the artist and has little to no relevance on her importance in Etruscan religion.

== Possible Greek equivalent ==
Ethausva's Greek equivalent is a birth goddess called Eileithya. This is not certain, but the similarities in their names and the similar nature of their spheres of influence lead to that conclusion. Eileithyia is the daughter of Zeus and Hera born on Crete, her main place of worship, specifically the city of Knossos. She is known as a goddess of childbirth and midwifery. This is similar to Ethausva who is also a goddess of childbirth and midwifery. Eileithyia was a more prominent figure in Greek religion than Ethausva was for the Etruscans. With Eileithyia, there were shrines to her, and she is related to other cults in the Greek religious. Ethausva is not as common in the Etruscan world. She is mentioned in very few places and has less of a chthonic nature.
