= Mingarope =

Australian Aboriginal deity

Mingarope is an obscure female deity. She features, along with Bund-jil, in Australian aboriginal creation narrative.

An 1879 work records that "Mingarope having retired upon a natural occasion was highly pleased with the red color of her excrement, which she began to mould into the form of a man, and tickling it, it showed signs of life and began to laugh."
