= Rearea =

Tahitian goddess of joy

Rearea is the goddess of joy in Tahitian mythology.
