= Kayin Maunghnama =

Burmese folklore spirits

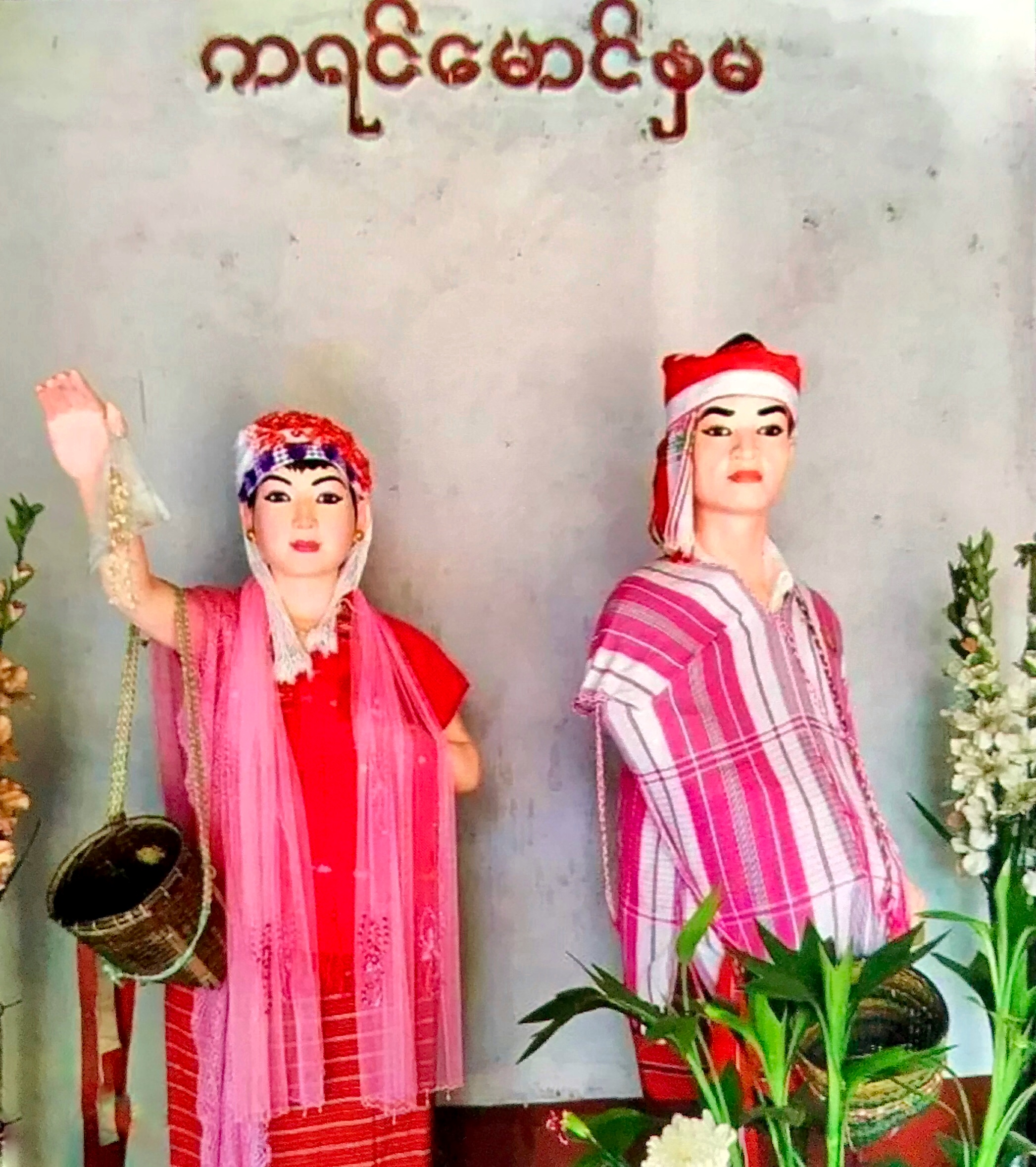
Statues of Kayin Maunghnama

Kayin Maunghnama (Burmese: ကရင်မောင်နှမ; lit. 'Kayin siblings') are two traditional Karen nats, named San Sae Phoe and Naw Mu Phan, who are believed to live in Mount Zwegabin, Hpa-An, Kayin State.

== Legend ==
According to local legends, a Karen man Saw Phar Thant and his wife Naw Phaw Ya had two children named San Sae Phoe and Naw Mu Phan. After years of saving and honestly collecting all the hard-earned money, he needed to initiate his son into the Buddhist order and to make a big donation. While he was working in the farm, he died after being bitten by a tiger due to bad luck. After the death of Saw Phar Thant, Naw Phaw Ya was left a widow with two children. And then she remarried with Saw Phar Pug, a widower from the same village. At that time, two innocent siblings, San Sae Po and Naw Mu Phan, were full of fear and anxiety. Anxiety and pain overwhelmed them. The quiet little house was full of swearing and shouting. The two siblings burst into tears under the angry and violent insults of their stepfather.

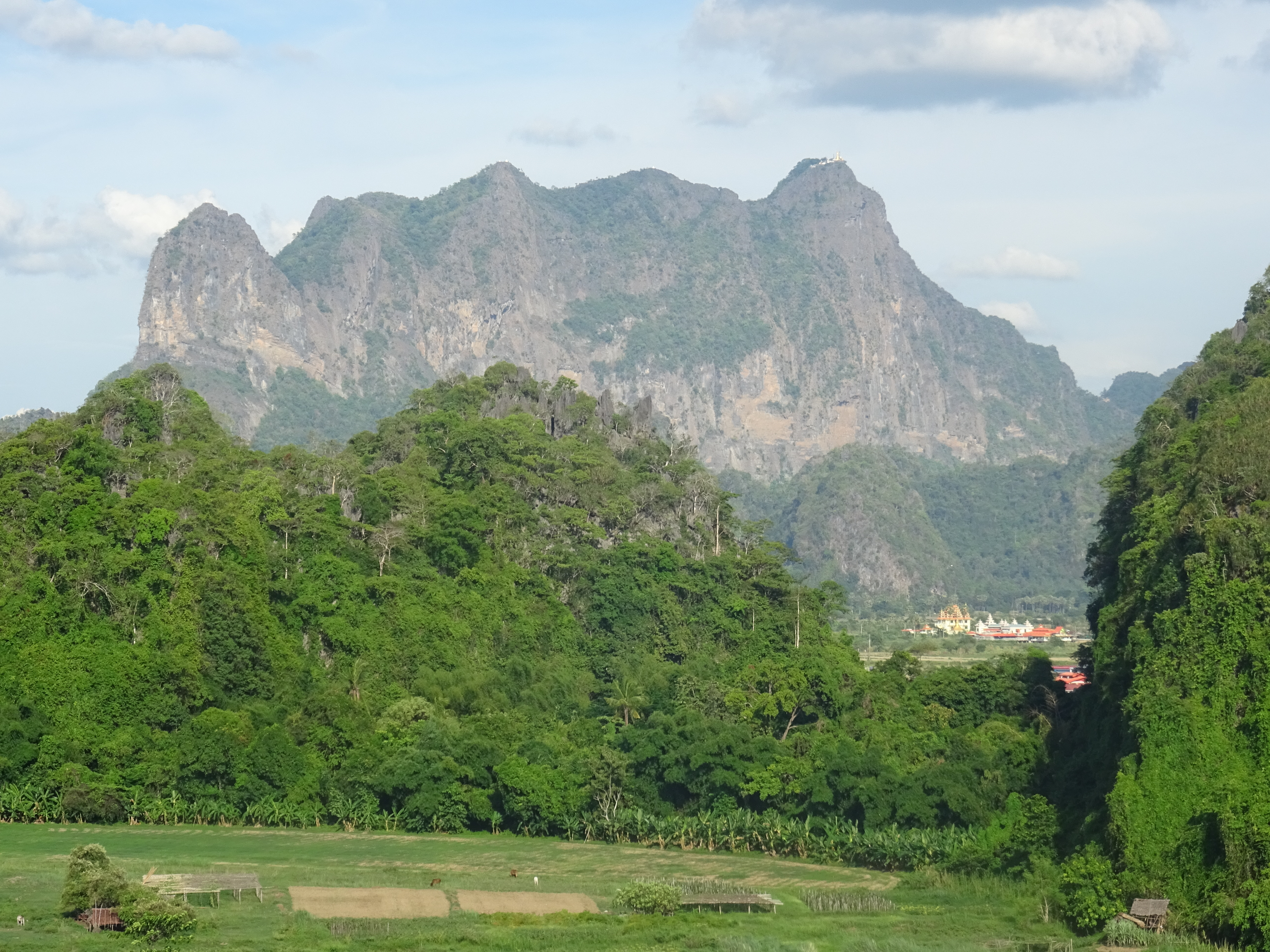
Mount Zwegabin

One day, the stepfather took two siblings to the farm and pushed them down a steep cliff on the way to the farm and returned home alone. Two brothers and sisters fell from the mountain and prayed for Zwegabin Pagoda to be saved so they survived by lying on a bamboo tree under the cliff without dying. The two siblings returned to their mother in almost dawn and told her all about it. Their mother, Naw Phaw Ya was sad and cried. However, when it was not possible to bring the two children back home, she hid them in a forest cave on Mount Zwegabin to keep them safe. The two siblings did not dare go far from the forest cave that their mother left behind. Everywhere they looked in the forest was dark. It was a place they had never been to before, where they could only hear the sounds of wild animals. The younger sister did not know anything so the elder brother had to take care of her. One day morning two siblings made a campfire in the cold weather and a weizza-hermit came to them and greets two siblings. And then he was given three golden pills and forced to go down into the fire, transforming into a young man and a young woman. The two siblings gained the power of influence. They took care Pagoda as promised to hermit, Work diligently for the sake of the Dhamma and all those who believe in the Dhamma and all those who come to the Mount Zwegabin to pray the Pagoda that you will be took care of them, two siblings.

The Kayin Maunghnama shrine was built about 50 years ago by Sayadaw U Kay Tu of Naung Ein Saing at the foot of Mount Zwegabin. Zwegabin Sayadaw U Kawidaza was also a pilgrimage resort. The Lumbini Garden has also been remodeled to make it more memorable.
