= Mareikura =

Mythological being

In the mythology of the Tuamotu islands, the Mareikura are the attendants of Io. In Māoridom, Mareikura are female spirits, similar to whatukura.
