= Asvayujau =

- Other names: Svasti, Vayupriya, Vayupattani
- Consort: Vayu

In Hinduism, Asvayujau is a goddess of fortune, good luck, joy and other names is Svasti wife of Vayu according to the Devi Bhagavata Purana.
