= Eschetewuarha =

Mother goddess of Chamacoco people

Eschetewuarha ("Mother of the universe") is a mother goddess of the Chamacoco people. She is the dominant deity in Chamacoco mythology.

Eschetewuarha is described as the mother of many spirits known as guarã, including forest spirits, as well as of the Osasero birds, who are associated with clouds. Eschetewuarha is the wife of the Great Spirit, who she controls and dominates. As the mother of clouds, Eschetewuarha controls rain, and she ensures that mankind obtain water and the Sun does not burn the earth. In return, Eschetewuarha expects people to send songs to her every night. If they failed to do so, Eschetewuarha will punish them.

Eschetewuarha is comparable to Gauteovan, the mother goddess of the Kogi people.

== Bibliography ==
- Métraux, Alfred (1946). "Ethnography of the Chaco". In Steward, Julian Haynes (ed.). Handbook of South American Indians: The Marginal Tribes. Vol. 1. U.S. Government Printing Office. pp. 197–370.
- Métraux, Alfred (1949). "Religion and Shamanism". In Steward, Julian Haynes (ed.). Handbook of South American Indians: The Comparative Ethnology of South American Indians. Vol. 5. U.S. Government Printing Office. pp. 559–600.
