= Satiada =

Celtic Goddess

Satiada was a Celtic goddess worshipped in Roman Britain. She is known from a single, unadorned altar-stone dedicated to her at Chesterholm (Vindolanda). The inscription reads:

DEAE / SAIIADAE / CVRIA TEX / TOVERDORVM / V·S·L·M
"To the goddess Satiada, the council of the Textoverdi willingly and deservedly fulfilled their vow."

The Textoverdi, whose curia left this altar, are otherwise unknown.

The name on the stone may alternatively be read as Sattada (the form used by Jufer and Luginbühl), Saitada or Saiiada. If it is read as Satiada, the name may conceivably be related to the Proto-Celtic *sāti- ‘saturation’ or *satjā- ‘swarm’.
