= Boyakonda Gangamma =

Hindu temple

Coordinates: 13.56756°N 78.46317°E

Boyakonda Gangamma is a temple dedicated to Gangamma Devi (an incarnation of Shakti) located at Boyakonda, in Annamayya District, Andhra Pradesh, India. The temple is situated near the village of Diguvapalli in Chowdepalli mandal, approximately 20 km from Madanapalle and 150 kms from Bangalore. It serves as a prominent Hindu pilgrimage center in the region.

== History ==
Centuries ago the tribals Boyas and "Pala Ekari" Caste lived in the forest area around the hillock. They stood up and resented the repressive and automatic rule of the Nawabs. They retaliated against the Muslim soldiers and chased them. The Golconda Nawab rushed additional troops to crush the revolt...tribals could not withstand the onslaught of the Muslim army and fled into the forest and prostrated near the hillock and prayed Almighty to save them. The spirit of the Goddess Shakti descended from the hillock, shielded the tribals and crushed the Nawab's army. Local people say that the Shakti has tied the heads of soldiers to banyan tree branches. In the event of victory Boyas And Pala Ekari's Combinedly built the Gangamma temple, which saved them against evil forces and became famous for centuries... Yet the Castes Of Boyars and Pala Ekari's are Dominant in The Area and Serving the Ammavaru...

== Legend ==
It is believed that the Goddess who gives her blessings to the devotees was discovered by the ancient local people here called as Boiya's and since then they are offering their devotion and prayers to the goddess.

== Temple ==
The temple of Goddess Gangamma is one of the many ancient temples located on top of a mountain. The word "Baikonda" pronounced as "Baa-ee-kon-da" means mountain which has a well. The Goddess resides right besides this well and is believed to be very powerful. This goddess is known to destroy all evil and those who sincerely worship her are bound to succeed. Her temple is dedicated to the sister of Venkateswara.

Devotees come here and make their wishes and once the wish comes true they come back to make an offering to the Goddess Gangamma which they would have agreed upon once their wish became true.

The water from the well is believed to cure many skin ailments. Local people believe that the Pushkarini water is very powerful, and sprinkling it in the field will yield good crop. Devotees can test whether their wishes will be fulfilled by placing a flower on the head of the deity. Locals believe that if the flower falls on the right side it is positive and negative if it falls on the left. Devotees who come here should take the "theertha", the holy water in the well that is believed to cure and ward off evil.

The offering for the Goddess is generally a hen or a sheep which will be sacrificed to the Goddess and the meat will be cooked at the same place and shall be eaten by all the family members who would have come along.

Once a year the temple Navartri festival brings in lakhs of people from all over India, particularly the south.

== Management ==
The Gangamma temple was taken over by Endowments Department of Andhra Pradesh in 1990. Since then an executive officer is in charge of administration of the temple and efforts were made to develop the temple and facilities were created for devotees.
