= Atua-anua =

Mother goddess in the mythology of Easter Island

Atua-anua is a mother goddess in the mythology of Easter Island.
