= Hina-Lau-Limu-Kala =

Hawaiian goddess of the sea

- Goddess of the sea
- Venerated in: Hawaiian religion
- Gender: Female

Hina-Lau-Limu-Kala is the goddess of the sea in Hawaiian mythology.

Pukui and Elbert describe Hina-Lau-Limu-Kala as living on the sea floor and was considered the most beautiful of the Hinas. She was a goddess of kahuna who were skilled in using medicines from the sea. Her name refers to the leaves of limu-kala seaweed.
