= Potii-ta-rire =

Mythological Tahitian goddess

Potii-ta-rire is the goddess of magic in Tahitian mythology.
