= Souconna (mythology) =

Celtic water deity

Souconna is a Celtic goddess, the deity of the river Saône at Chalon-sur-Saône, to whom epigraphic invocation was made.
