= Xmucane and Xpiacoc =

Characters in Maya mythology

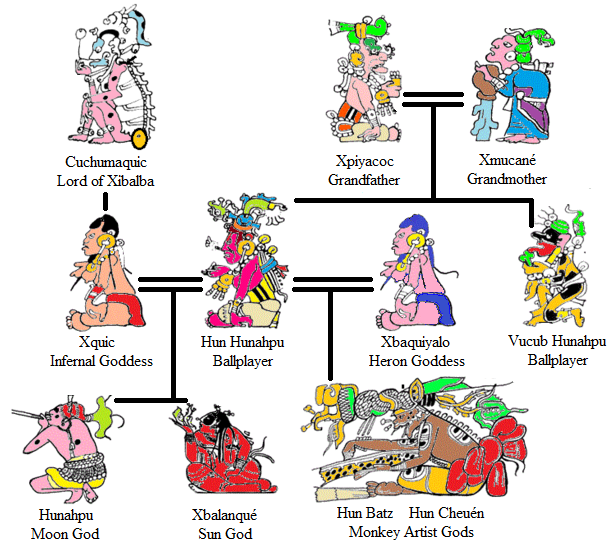
A family tree described in the Popol Vuh with Xmucane and Xpiyacoc at the top with other deities descending from them.

Xmucane ([ʃmukaˈne]) and Xpiacoc ([ʃpijaˈkok]), alternatively Xumucane and Ixpiyacoc (Xpiyacoc) , are the names of the divine grandparents of Maya mythology of the Kʼicheʼ people and the daykeepers of the Popol Vuh. They are considered to be the oldest diviners who are very close to the supreme creators of the Kʼicheʼ pantheon and are identified by a number of names throughout the text, reflecting their multiple roles throughout the Maya creation myth. They are usually mentioned together, although Xmucane seems to be alone during most of the interactions with the Maya Hero Twins, when she is referred to as simply "grandmother".

In the Popol Vuh of the Maya, Xpiyacoc and Xmucane perform divinatory handcasting during the creation of humankind. Similarly, the Aztec Codex Borbonicus depicts the first human couple, Oxomoco and Cipactonal, using maize kernels for divination.

The pair were invoked during the creation of the world in which the Maya gods were attempting to create humanity. Xmucane and Xpiacoc ground the maize that was used in the third, successful attempt to make people, after a first attempt with mud and a second with wood, the products of which were described as being simply mannequins and not real people. These two are also invoked, often by other powerful deities, for their powers in divination and matchmaking.

Xmucane herself also plays an integral role in the development of the Maya Hero Twins. She was at first wary of them and their mother, Xquic, and ordered them out of her house when they were yet infants, but she would come to accept them almost as her own sons, raising and caring for them.
