= Tomam =

Deity of the Siberian Ket people

Among the Ket people of Siberia, Tomam was the goddess of migratory birds. She was associated with the south, warmth, and the northern migration of birds that accompanies the warmer months. In the autumn, birds migrating southward were considered to be returning to "Mother Tomam".
