= Kenas-unarpe =

Ainu god

Kenas-unarpe (ケナㇱウナㇻペ) is an Ainu wen kamuy (evil god).

She is described as akin to a mountain hag (yama-uba) with matted hair, or a monstrous bird. An origin myth says that she was born from the creator god's failed attempt at crafting the first fire making tool, another version says she spawned from the god's used and discarded axes that rotted into mire.

She is also described as using bears (or other animals turned bear) as minions for her misdeeds, including the killing of livestock or humans, and she is a trickster especially to the hunter. Sometimes she is accused of blood-sucking as well.

== Nomenclature ==
She is called Kenas-unarpe ("aunt of the woodland plain" or "aunt of the swampy bush") and called Kenas-kor-unarpe (Note: Japanese: ケナシコルウナルペ.) in the Saru District or Horobetsu region in former Iburi Province (present-day Noboribetsu). She is otherwise known as Nitat-unarpe ("aunt of the swamps" or "marshes" (Note: Styled "Nital unarabe" by Batchelor who glosses the term thus.)). (Note: Munro styles the evil goddess "Kenash (or Nitat) Unarabe".) She is called iwa met e-yep[?] (Note: Japanese: イワメテイェプ. In Ainu apparently iwa "mountain", iwa "deep mountain", and eyep, ayep "said to be". Possibly a portion is missing. The bear god is sometimes called met so e-horari a kamuy (メトトソエホラリアカムィ), composed with so "seat, place to be", so "seat, place to be", e-horari "lives in", a "was there".) ("mountain demon") in the Teshio District.

== Mythology ==
=== Appearance ===
The kenas-unarpe according to the folklore of Saru District or Horobetsu, has disheveled hair "as if wearing a half-woven saranip (Japanese: kodashi, a sort of woven bag)", which is a cliché stock phrase. She is a monstrous woman, compared to the yama-uba or "mountain hag". (Note: Ishii (2011), p. 175 citing Takashima (2003).) She uses sorcery to use animals as minions or familiars, making them shapeshift, even to attack humans (e.g., turns a squirrel into a bear cub. Cf. the narrative of the § Bear cub in captivity). (Note: Ishii (2011), p. 175 citing Chiri (1973c) = Ezo obake retsuden.) She is said to be a she-monster dwelling inside hollows of trees or willow plains by the river shore, and people were cautioned never to camp out at such places.

Her hair hangs over her face, so it is not easy to tell apart which is the front or the back of her. In one story, a kenas-urupe appears with her hair hanging over the front her hide her face, and weds a man in an Ainu village, but eventually leaves with her children. (Note: Ishii (2011), p. 179, example K9.) Another source says that her black face has neither eyes nor a mouth, but only a thumb-like nose.

=== As bird monster ===
According to some lore, the kenas-unarpe is a monster-bird resembling a type of a horned owl called ahunrasampe by the Ainu, according to Mashiho Chiri and also according to him this particular bird species is the short-eared owl (Asio flammeus). But another view is that the deity is a "scops owl". (Note: Irimoto (1988), p. 137 also writes that the evil deity is a konohazuku (Oriental scops owl). However, this particular species is known in Japan for the peculiar screeching and figures in the Ainu tale below, cf. § Origin of nightjar or scops owl.)

The kenas-unarpe, one informant tells, is an evil bird that tricks people (Cf. § Trickster and vampire below).

As Ainu expert Hisakazu Fujimura explains, an Ainu deity when assuming its natural animalistic form, whether this be the mountain bear god or the avian kenas-unarpe, is less a threat of humans, but when they shed their usual "armor" (hayokpe）) and assume human form, they are often ready to do more sinister harm on humans.

=== Trickster and vampire ===
According to a god-song or yukar, when people are trying to bring down a bear cub captured alive down from the mountain, kenas-unarpe will strike the bear with her "evil god arrow" (wen-kamui ai) which will deteriorate the quality of the bear's fur. (Note: "Peurep kamui isoitak (The epic of a bear kid kamui)". apud Irimoto (1988), p. 137 and note 18).)

According to Neil Gordon Munro she sometimes takes on the appearance of Hasinaw-uk-kamuy, the goddess of the hunt, in order to deceive hunters: just as the hunter thought he had struck his prey with his arrow, his catch will disappear or escape unscathed. Her likeness to Hasinaw-uk-kamuy is not perfect, however, and she conceals her face with her long hair. (Note: Munro (1979) also seconded by Ashkenazi and Irimoto in Japanese. both citing Munro.) (Note: Irimoto in Japanese actually cites this material frmo Munro ms.(Munro's Ainu Material (Royal Anthropological Institute of Great Britain and Ireland) rather than the printed Munro (1963) edition.)

She is also known as a blood-sucking vampire, who partakes of blood from injured people or from hunters sleeping in the wilderness.

Kenas-unarpe's association with blood makes her important in childbearing. She is sometimes invoked during a difficult childbirth, in a sly way, using a type of liturgy called shi-upashkuma itak ("true-lore talk"), that is to say, invoking an evil god under the auspices of a good god. The evil deity was supposedly bribed with a "swig of blood" into carrying out the impure ritual.

=== Origin myth ===
One etiological myth relates that when the creator god Kotan-kar-kamuy attempted to invent fire making, he first tried using poplar or Populus suaveolens (Ainu: yai-ni) (Note: The Ainu name means "just ordinary tree"; the Japanese name doro no ki means "mud tree".) which didn't work and the tools turned into evil deities: the poplar "pestle" (fire drill) became kenas-urupe while the "mortar" base became mosir-sinnaysam (Cf. Kotan-kar-kamuy for further details).

Whereas, according to John Batchelor, Nitat-unarpe and "mother swamp" are said to have emerged from the mire left by the decomposing 60 axe tools that the supreme God had made for creating the earth. (Note: Bachelor (1901), also paraphrased by Irimoto (in Japanese).) They and their offspring subjugated bears used to attack horses and even humans. They also caused illnesses and epileptic attacks. (Note: Batchelor (1901) also paraphrased in Japanese by Irimoto (1988), p. 137)

== Folktales ==
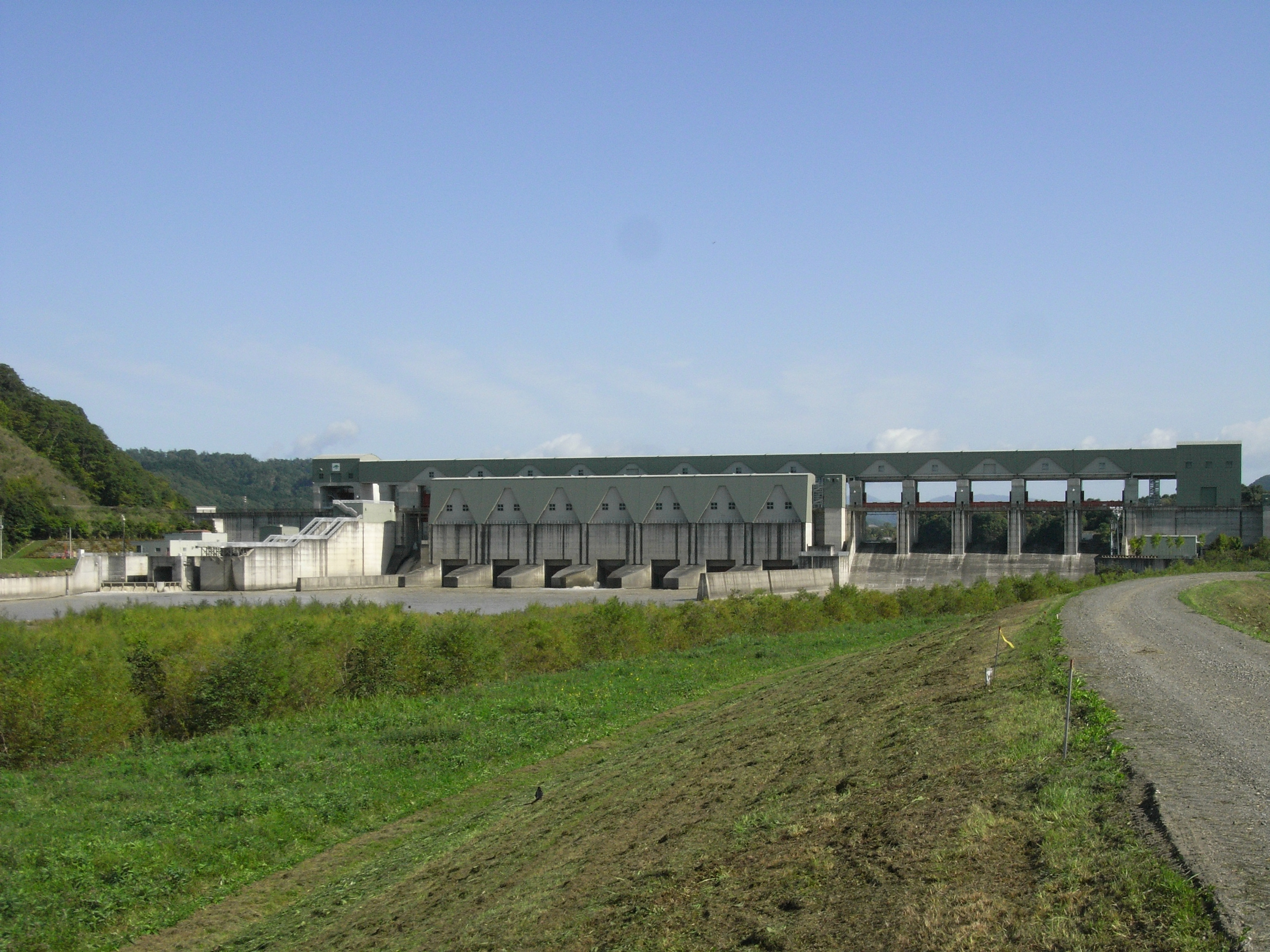
Nibutani

=== Bear cub in captivity ===
A tale from Nibutani settlement, Saru District tells if a man who caught a bear cub separated from its mother and raising it in a barred cage. One night when he peeked a look, he saw a messy-haired kenas-unarpe woman in front of the cage, and the cub had turned into a bald-headed boy. The boy was dancing to the beat of her hand-clapping. The village elder decided to rid of these demons, by first having six special inau (ritual poles with wood-shaving decor done on them) and placing them in strategic positions. Then, he commenced a mock bear-sending ceremony (iomante), choosing exactly the wrong direction to properly conduct it, then dragged out the bear with a chastity belt and clubbed it, whereby the beast turned into a dead squirrel (that is to say, kenas-unarpe can transform one creature into another). The moral is never to pick up a strayed cub just because an easy opportunity presents.

In a similar tale, the Nitat-unarpe transforms her own son into a bear cub and releases it, and a beguiled rich mam (nispa) takes the cub in and raises it in a barred cage, but it turned out to be such a glutton, the man was nearly bankrupt. As the bear-sending ceremony season approached, the dogs making rancor drew the man to take a peak, and he saw the woman outside the cage dancing the set kari upopo meant for the iomante ceremony, and she had her son also dancing in red clothing. They were actually doing the dance for a sort of reverse iomante sending, that is to say killing the people of the household instead. Again, there is a moral, not to readily take every windfall as a gift from god. (Note: Shitaku, Yae, prose narrative or tuitak. apud Fujimura.)

=== Daughter of the rich man upstream ===
In the tale recited by Steno Orita (recorded 1981) entitled Kawakami no chōja no monogatari (川上の長者の娘の物語; "Daughter of the rich man upstream"), (Note: The Ainu title is I-petpeni nispa kor matnepo but in actuality, the reciter gave two tales (uwepeker) under the same title, version U1 involving fishery, and this present version U2.) the girl named in the title has spiritual powers, so the father sends her on a dangerous task to investigate and help out the rich man mid-stream, whose younger son has been trying to marry many times only to have the bride killed straightaway. The girl gains even greater skill of awareness by praying to the fire goddess, so that when the demonic culprit loses patience and decides to kill the younger son and carry him off, the girl forces the poisoned wine cup away. She then asks the fire goddess to capture the evil goddess, namely, "the woodland plain's weird-woman" (kenas-unarpe) who had fallen in love with the groom. The groom recovers thanks to prayers and medicine, and as the girl was about to leave, she was asked to stay and become the wife. As in this tale, evil deities whose identity has been unmasked suddenly lose their magical powers.

=== Origin of nightjar or scops owl ===
Batchelor (1901) records a story that relates the origins of the nightjar (or "goat-sucker", which perhaps should be emended to "scops owl", as explained below). A mother leaves the child in a cradle, placed dangling in a tree in the garden, and the Nitat-unarpe (Note: Batchelor (1901), p. 184: "nitat un[a]rabe, i. e. 'the aunt of the swamps'" Japanese commentary is given by Inada and Ozawa (1989) which glosses the name as "grandmother of the swamp".) steals the child away. The villagers all resigned to the probability that some wild animal had taken it. But the child appears in the dreams of all of them, relating what actually happened. He had managed to slip away and returned to the garden, crying hapo totto, huci totto meaning "give me milk, granny, mommy", but went unheeded, mistaken for some wild creature's cry. And the "swamp hag" returned and recaptured him, this time turning him into a bird, whose cry ever became the same milk-begging exclamation. (Note: Batchelor (1925), Ainu to sono setsuwa (Japanese translation), Fūkido, parphrased in Nihon mukashibanashi tsūgan.)

Batchelor gives the Ainu name of the bird as tokitto and insists this is a nightjar ("goat sucker") called Caprimulgus by the Romans, apparently to draw a parallel between the Ainu milk-begging boy-bird story and the ancient Roman lore that nightjars suckled on goats. However, Japanese commentators disagree and gloss tokitto as the scops owl, whose Japanese common name is konohazuku also nicknamed buppōsō (仏法僧; "Buddhist-law monk"), supposedly because its call sounds like "buppōsō".

There is yet another version where an old woman loses track of her granddaughter when they go hunting together for Cardiocrinum cordatum lily bulbs (Japanese: ubayuri), and the girl is abducted by the "weird-hag of the forest", and transformed into the scops owl that screeched like a child begging for milk (lore of Kushiro or Tokachi). Still another version has a grandmother go gathering wild grapes in the mountain with her grandchild who gets lost and dies. A god sympathized and transformed the child into a tokitto (scops owl). (Note: Kuzuno, Tatsujirō 葛野辰次郎 (1983) Kami no katari 神の語り, p .1. apud Nihon mukashibanashi tsūgan.)

== See also ==
- List of legendary creatures from Japan
