= Bhutamata =

Form of Hindu goddess Parvati

Bhutamata (Sanskrit: भूतमता, romanized: Bhūtamatā) is a frighful form of the Hindu goddess Parvati, sometimes also regarded to be the shakti (divine feminine energy) of the deity Kartikeya.

== Legend ==
In the Skanda Purana, the deity Kartikeya allowed the bhutas (ghosts), pishachas, and vetalas along the banks of the river Sarasvati to consume Vedic ritual offerings that were performed incorrectly. However, these beings eventually started to consume all the offerings made to the devas, who complained to Kartikeya. Out of the deity's fury, a twelve-eyed goddess emerged from between his eyebrows and sought to serve him. Kartikeya commanded her to bring the disobedient creatures to submission and restore them to right conduct. Accompanied by a host of numerous goddesses, the goddess attacked the creatures, who quickly propitiated her. Pleased, the goddess offered a boon to the creatures. They requested that she be Bhutamata (the mother of the bhutas) and promised to never transgress the laws of Kartikeya.
