= Iouga =

Iouga is a suggested reconstruction of the name of a Romano-British goddess known from a single fragmentary inscription on an altar-stone at York. The name appears as Ioug[...] or Iou[...] on the damaged stone, which reads:

NVMINIB AVG ET DEAE IOV[...]
SIVS AEDEM PRO PARTE D[...]

To the numina of the Emperor(s) and to the goddess Iou[..], [..]sius (built/restored) a (half?) part of a temple.

Reading the fragmentary name as Ioug[...], Roger Wright proposed the reconstructed form Iouga, which he linked with the Proto-Celtic *jugā meaning 'yoke'. However, Theresia Pantzer, reviewing the stone, suggests that what Wright had perceived as traces of a letter g was merely "damage to the stone rather than part of a letter". The goddess is otherwise unknown.
