= Merau =

Goddess of death in Polynesian mythology

In Polynesian mythology, Merau is a goddess of death and the underworld.
