= Anaideia =

Greek mythological figure

In Greek mythology, Anaideia (Ancient Greek: Ἀναιδείας, lit. 'shamelessness') was the personification of shamelessness. She was the companion of Hybris. Her opposite partner was Eleos, the goddess of mercy.
