= Nujalik =

Inuit deity

In Inuit mythology, Nujalik is the goddess of hunting on land.

For reference, Sedna is the goddess of sea hunting (whaling, fishing, etc.).
