= Planē (mythology) =

Personification of error in Ancient Greek mythology

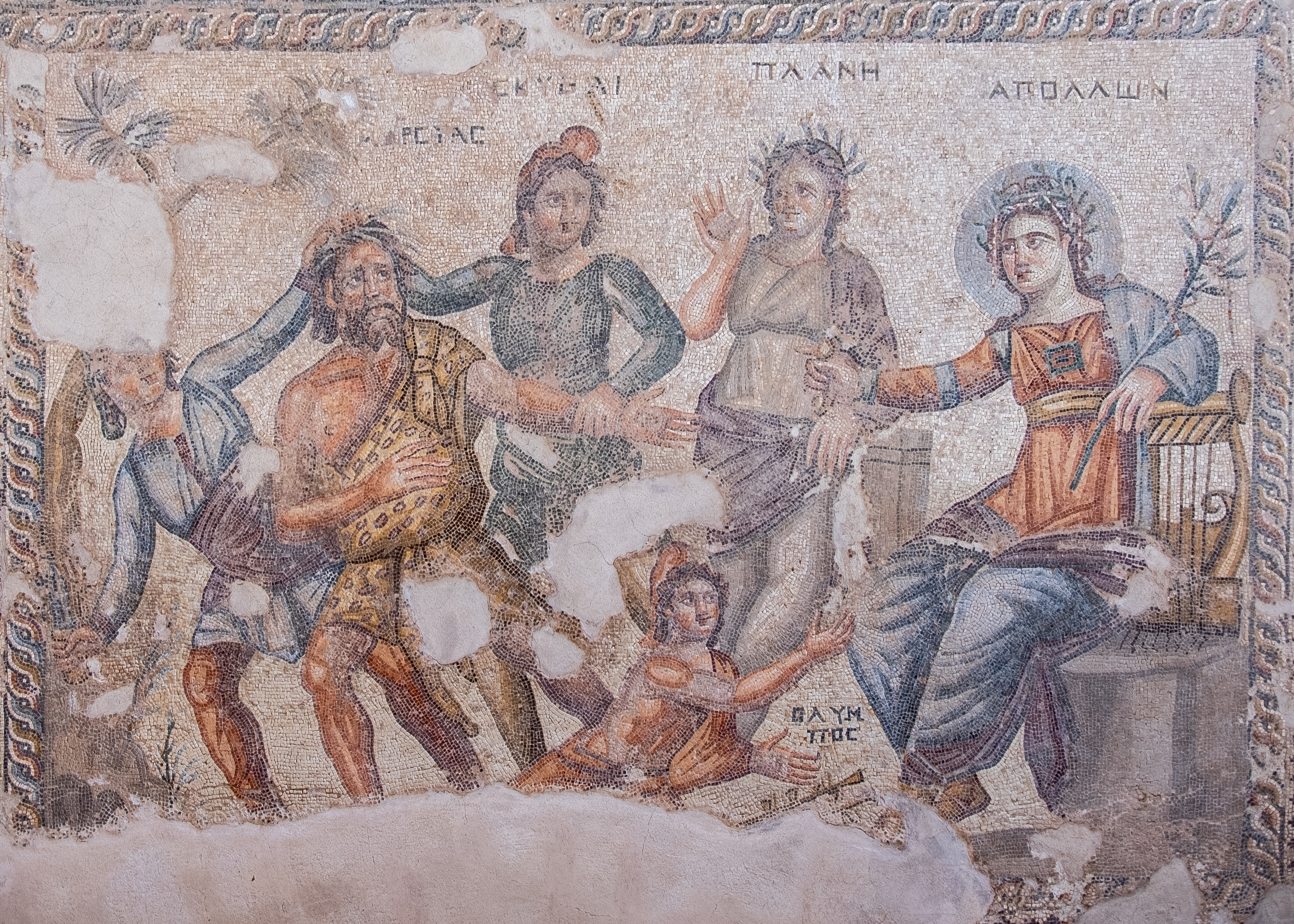
Plane next to Apollo from a Roman mosaic in the Paphos Archaeological Park, Cyprus.

Planē or Plane /ˈpleɪniː/ (Ancient Greek: Πλάνη), in ancient Greek religion, was an abstract goddess, the personification of the concept of error (her name deriving from the Greek term for 'wandering' [see planet ] ). Though her mythology is obscure, it is known that she was present at the musical competition between the god Apollo and the satyr Marsyas. She is depicted in that scene, looking on in horror at the sight of Marsyas about to be flayed for losing, in a few 4th century mosaics in the House of Aion in Nea Paphos.

Planē (or Plane) is also referred to, as an abstract concept, in Christian and Gnostic philosophy.

== See also ==
- Hamartia
