= Eukarpia (theonym) =

Ancient Greek personification or epithet

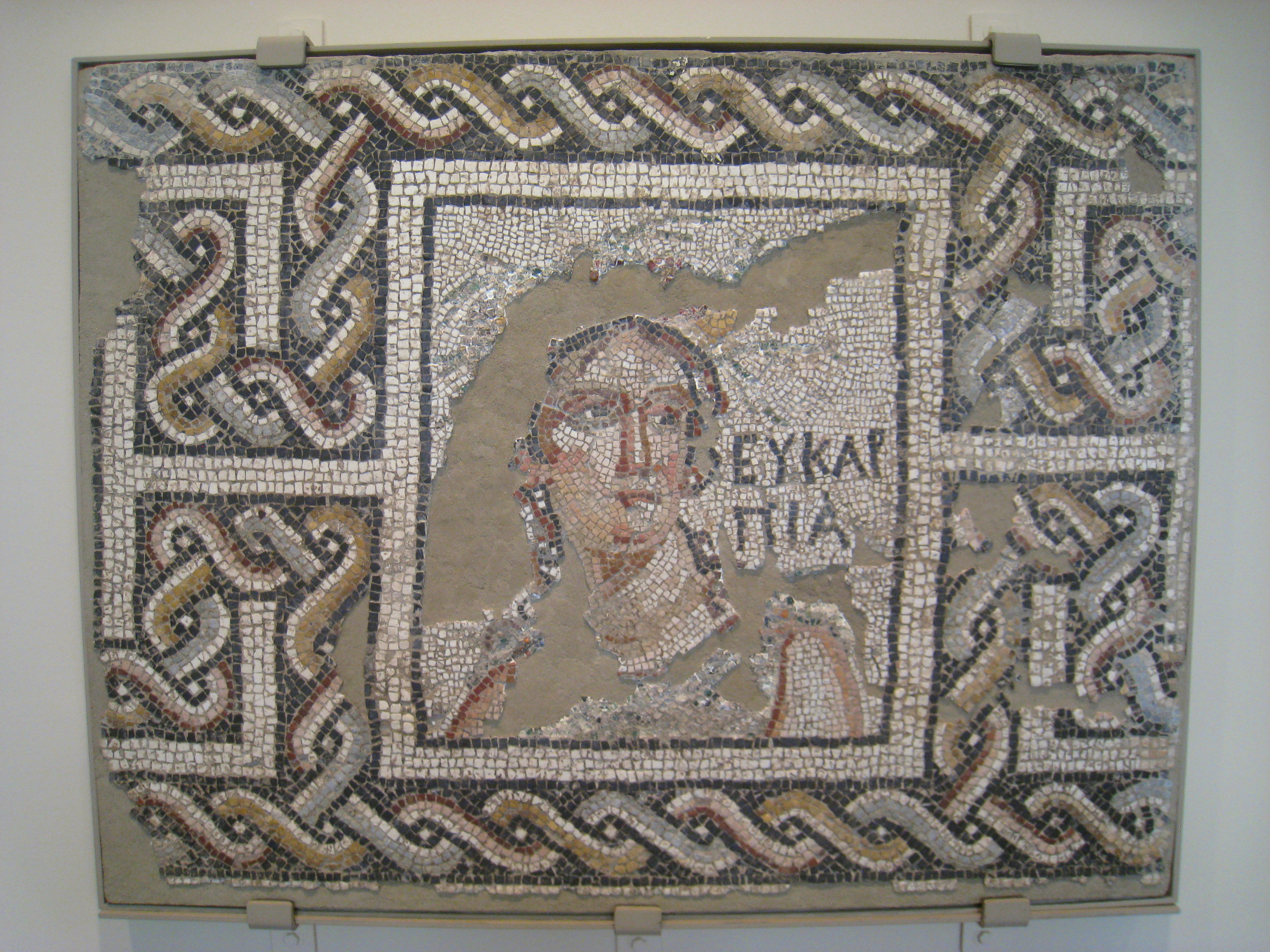
Eukarpia on a mosaic from Antioch (Worcester Art Museum)

In ancient Greek religion and myth, Eukarpia ("well-fruited" or "She of the rich harvest") was a divine personification of fertility, or an epithet or cult title for a deity. It is also found as a personal name for women (as Eukarpides for men).

In poetry, the name is an epithet of Aphrodite, Demeter, and Dionysus. In Gonnoi, Thessaly, Eukarpia appears as a name for invoking Ge (Earth).

In a mosaic from the Tomb of Mnemosyne, Antioch, she is wearing earrings and an arm-baring tunic formed from tesserae of blue-green glass. On her head is a wreath of red and yellow fruit.
