= Sarna Burhi =

Tree goddess worshiped by some Bengali peoples

Sarna Burhi (en: Woman of the Grove) is a deity worshiped by various animist peoples living in the Bengal region of India and Bangladesh. Sarna Burhi is depicted as the goddess of Sal tree groves and she is strongly associated with water and plant life. The deity is traditionally worshiped by the Munda, Kurukh, and Oraon peoples of Bengal.

== Description ==
Sarna Burhi is described as being a goddess associated with spirits, rain, and plants. In the culture of the Munda and Kurukh peoples (both of which constitute part of the Adivasi peoples), Sarna Burhi is depicted as the guardian of Sarna, sacred groves of trees that serve as refuges for spirits displaced by human activity. These sites are described by some sources as remnant of old Sal forests which used to cover parts of Bengal's landscape. In the tradition of the peoples who worship at the groves, the Sal trees cause misfortune to fall on any who harm or cut down the trees that make up a Sarna. Rather, the groves are treated as sacred places.

Sarna play a significant role in the religious activities of several cultures originating in Bengal, where individual villages often worship their own pantheon of deities. The goddess Sarna Burhi resides in and protects these sacred spaces and as such worshipers of the faith pay homage to her during religious festivals that involve the Sarna.

In the culture of the Munda peoples, some villages participate in a religious ceremony held in honor of Sarna Burhi. During the ceremony, several fowl are ritually slaughtered in front of an idol or symbol of the goddess near the Sarna. The worshipers then hold a feast during which the fowl are consumed. A procession, accompanied by music (produced by drums and horns), is then started leading back to the village; the worshipers also spread sal blossoms in their wake, which are later used to decorate the doors of the village's houses.
