= A'akuluujjusi =

Inuit deity

In Inuit religion, A'akuluujjusi is considered the great creator mother, a primordial goddess.

== Creation myth ==
A'akuluujjusi created animals from her clothes. First, she set her trousers on the ground, creating caribou, and gave them tusks. When she threw her jacket down, it turned into a walrus; she placed antlers on its head. The animals kept attacking people who tried to hunt them, so she made some revisions, swapping horns and tusks. She found the walrus was perfect with tusks. Yet, the caribou was running too fast to be caught by hunters. Therefore, she turned his belly hair against the wind to slow him down.
