= Abeguwo =

Goddess of Melanesian mythology

Abeguwo is a goddess within Melanesian mythology. It is believed by some that she resides in the sky, and when she feels the urge to urinate, does so onto the Earth in the form of rain. She is worshipped by people who hold indigenous beliefs in the region of Melanesia and the island of New Guinea but also in the surrounding region.
