= Iyatiku =

Goddess of the Keresan Pueblos

Iyatiku is the corn goddess of the Keresan Puebloes. From Shipap, her underground realm, humanity first emerged, from there infants today are born and tither go the dead. To provide food for them, she plants bits of her heart in fields to the north, west, south, and east. Later the pieces of Iyatiku's heart grow into fields of corn. The Cochiti Puebloes regard Mesewi as the hero who had led the ancestors of the tribe out of Shipap.

She is associated with compassion, agriculture, and children. Her symbols are Beans, Cavern, Corn, Seeds and Soil. She has no Totem Animal.
