= Eunostus =

Ancient Greek goddess, patroness of mills

In Greek mythology, Eunostus (Ancient Greek: Εὔνοστος, romanized: Eúnostos) was a goddess whose image was set up in mills, and who was believed to keep watch over the just weight of flour.

Promylaia (Ancient Greek: Προπύλαια, romanized: Promylaia, lit. 'the one that stands before/protects the mill') was another name for a goddess of the mills, who was worshipped in the same fashion as Eunostus.
