= Phật Mẫu Man Nương =

Man Nương Phật Mẫu (蠻娘佛母) is a Vietnamese Buddhist deity associated with the belief of Tứ Pháp. During the reign of Shi Xie, a monk known as Kaundinya (Khâu Đà La), also called Xà Lê or Đồ Lê (闍梨) travelled to Luy Lâu (in modern-day Bắc Ninh province) to spread Buddhism there. Man Nương followed him and attended his teaching, but one day she fall asleep at the temple. When Kaundinya came back, he walked through her body. Somehow this made her pregnant with a child, and so gave the child to Kaundinya in shame. Kaundinya put the child in a tree and gave Man Nương a staff that can summon water in times of drought. One day the tree housing the child collapsed due to the rain, and floated on the water. As the failed to collect the wood from the tree, they asked for Man Nương's help and she pulled the tree to the land. Inside the tree, the child has turned into a rock. Meanwhile, the wood of the tree was used to create four goddesses: Pháp Vân (法雲) of cloud; Pháp Vũ (法雨) of rain; Pháp Lôi (法雷) of thunder and Pháp Điện (法電) of lightning - collectively known as Tứ Pháp (四法).
