= Ma (Sumerian mythology) =

Sumerian goddess

Ma is a Sumerian word meaning "land" that in Sumerian mythology was also used to regard Primordial Land.

There seems to be some loss in records as to the transition, but the same name Ma appears again later, also tied to the Earth, in Ma being referred to as "Mother of the mountain" - in this case, Kur (Mountain) the first dragon god.

The underworld Kur is the void space between the primeval sea (Abzu) and the earth (Ma).
