= Shwe Kyunbin Maunghnama =

Burmese folklore spirits

Shwe Kyunbin Maunghnama (Burmese: ရွှေကျွန်းပင်မောင်နှမ; lit. 'Golden tectona siblings') are traditional nats of Shan ethnicity commonly venerated in the vicinity of some villages near Mandalay and Sagaing. The nat festival in honour of the spirits of Shwe Kyunbin brother and sister is alive with the teeming crowd from upcountry annually.

== Legend ==
According to oral tradition, the Shwe Kyunbin brother and sister were the grandchildren of the Saopha of Momeik, and became nats when they were pressed under the block of Tectona tree while they were playing near the Shweli River. Their names were Sao Nan Thwe (sister) and Sao Nan Aung (brother), and their ages of becoming nats are 15 and 13 years respectively. Their spirits accompanied the tree as it drifted downriver.

When the tree landed near Momeik Mound, near Mingun, the local people tried to threw it back in the river. But the tree kept returning to the spot, and although the tree was decayed, it sprouted leaves. It came to Mingun's chief abbot in a dream that the tree was linked to the spirits of the two children, and a nat shrine was set up there in their honour.

== Shrine ==
The shrine of Kyunbin nats is on the Sagaing-Mingun motor road, next to Momeik Mound, Mingun region. Next to the shrine is the huge tectona tree. It is said that, when the time come to bloom, the blossom of the tree always face towards the shrine. On the each side of the entry, there are Statue of Snake, for the sister to ride, and Statue of Tiger, for the brother to ride. There is another official rest-a-while shrine called Kondauk Nan of Kyunbin Nats at Taungbyone village.

== Appanage ==
Kyunbin brother and sister possessed 12 alluvial lands, along the Mandalay and Sagaing banks of Ayeyarwady River, to venerate them. The 12 lands are Hsin Kyun, Daung Kyun, Thamingyan, Phaye Kyun, Dingar Kyun, Nattaw Kyun, Moegyoe Kyun, Yayle Kyun, Aye Kyun, Paukwe, Kyun Khin (1) and (2). Being Shan nats, they are also venerated by some Shan nat believers.

== Festival programs or ritual setting ==
As Kyunbin Nat Festival is held earlier than other Nat Festivals, there is a saying that the Starter of the Nat Festivals is Shwe Kyunbin.

The nat festival of Kyunbin is held three times a year:

- Paying obeisance festival from the first to the sixth waxing days of Wagaung:
  - 1st day – Opening ceremony and meeting of nat royal council
  - 2nd day – The ritual shower
  - 3rd day – Swinging of nat statues
  - 4th day – Swinging of spirit mediums
  - 5th day – Going round the royal garden
  - 6th day – Cutting eugenia tree
- Going to the battle front on the 13th and 14th waning days of Tabaung, and
- Their return from the battle front on the 4th and 5th waxing days of Nayon.
