= Amay Yay Yin =

Burmese nat

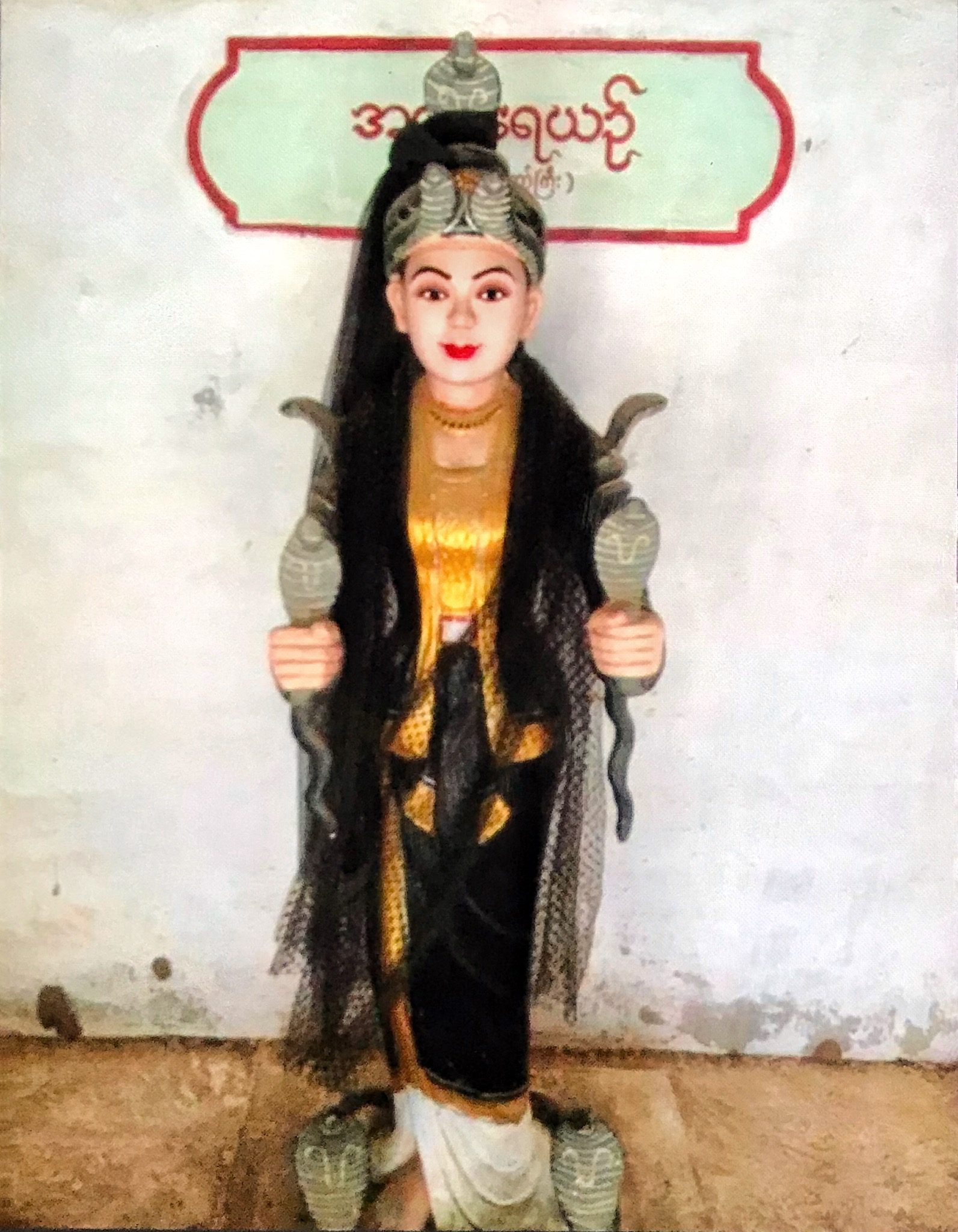
Statute of Amay Yay Yin

Amay Yay Yin (Burmese: အမေရေယဉ်; lit. 'mother of the stream or soft water underground', also known as Yayin Kadaw; Burmese: ရေယဉ်ကတော်) is a prominent Burmese nat. She is recognized as one of the five mother nats, also referred to as "Anauk Medaw" (Burmese: အနောက်မယ်တော်; lit. 'royal mother of the west'). Unlike other Burmese nats, who became spirits after a violent death, Amay Yay Yin became a nat without experiencing death.

== Legend ==
During the reign of King Alaungsithu, he had a queen named Nagasena, who was actually a flying witch. On the opposite side of the river from Pagan, there lived five siblings: the eldest Zeedaw Kyaw, myoza of Taungoo, and his sisters Shin U, Shin Byu, Shin Kyu, and Shin Tuu, in the area of the Kadu Kanan ethnic group at Pontaung Ponnya. The four sisters were skilled in the arts of gandari and were witches as well. One day, while eating clouds, the four sisters were attacked with magical power by the queen in the sky. However, the queen lost in the competition of occult.

Following this, the youngest sister Shin Tuu, also known as Saw Nan Mu's soul was placed into a bottle gourd and buried under the deep sea to attain immortality with the help of Kawei Thara Bo Bo Gyi, the chief of witches. The queen harbored resentment toward them and tried to cause mischief by telling King Alaungsithu that she had dreamt that the five siblings from the Kadu region were planning to seize the throne and that they were witches (kaweis). Unfortunately, the king believed her deceit and ordered the governor of Pagan, Bo Bo Gyi, to capture the five siblings and invite them to the Pagan Palace to pay tribute. Upon receiving the order, the five siblings arranged to bring local crops and oil as tribute. On the day of their visit to the palace, while walking down the street, Saw Nan Mu carried a pot of sesame oil on her head. Governor Bo Bo Gyi became curious about the contents of the pot and asked her what was inside. Although it was clear that there was an oil pot, realizing that the governor intended to create a problem, she angrily answered that there were snakes inside the pot. When the governor put his hand into the oil, he was struck by snake and died.

Considering these events, the king suspected she was a witch because she transformed into a snake from the sesame oil, resulting in the governor's death. Consequently, the soldiers arrested them, but Saw Nan Maw managed to escape. The troops pursued her, but were unsuccessful. Thus, the king ordered her brother to arrest her and promised him freedom. However, he didn't follow the order and fled from Pagan, ultimately falling into an abyss where he met his demise and became a nat. Following Zeedaw Kyaw's escape, the king ordered the execution of the three sisters, Shin U, Shin Byu, and Shin Kyu, by burning them alive. However, the people of their region managed to save them from execution, but the three sisters later died under different circumstances and became nats.

Saw Nan Mu believed that her siblings' death was caused by Alaungsithu. Fueled by a desire for revenge, she intended to destroy Pagan using her magical powers. She went up to the Ponetaung Ponenya region, and as she walked to Pagan, water sprang forth when she angrily dug the ground with her heel. The places where she dug with her heel still flow water and remain to this day. That's why Saw Nan Mu is called Amay Yay Yin (the mother of soft water underground).

On her way to Pagan, she was stopped by the lord of celestials, Śakra. Śakra tried to negotiate between Alaungsithu and her and asked her to donate her magical arts as an offering to him, and she agreed to his request. Then, she transferred her magical arts into a snake. Śakra killed the snake by cutting it into three parts. She threw away three parts of the snake, and the head part fell into Yinmabin, resulting in the region having an abundance of venomous snakes. The middle part fell into Yaw, where many people in that region are said to automatically learn magic arts within their mother's womb. Finally, the tail part fell into Monywa, causing that region to rarely see venomous snakes. As a reward, Śakra transformed her into a divine being or nymph. It is said that among Burmese nats, Saw Nan Mu is the only one who became a nat without experiencing death.

While King Alaungsithu was traveling along the Chindwin River by royal barge, Saw Nan Mu used her magical power to stop the royal barge. She manifested herself in front of the king and explained what had happened. After the king learned about the sins of his queen Nagasena, he ordered her execution. As a result, the king granted Saw Nan Mu possession of the Pale region and the Ponetaung Ponenya region (present-day Yinmabin District) as her spiritual fief.

== Worship ==
Her local followers believe that by worshiping her, they will experience a productive harvest, successful business, and support for increasing their crops and health. In the area of Amay Yay Yin, if a well is dug to about 300 feet, water naturally flows out from the water pipes to the surface of the ground. She is considered a nature spirit and the "kawei" (witch) type within the pantheon of Burmese nats. Amay Yay Yin's shrine is situated at ninety-nine water reservoirs in Yinmabin Township.

The festival of Amay Yay Yin is celebrated on the full moon day of Tabaung each year in Zeetaw village, Yinmabin Township. It is particularly renowned among local farmers. The festival venue spans more than 75 acres, hosting over a thousand shops at the shrine square during the festivities. People from the Pontaung Ponnya area gather to offer bananas, coconuts, flowers, and Eugenia myrtifolia at the shrine during the Amay Yay Yin festival.
