= Manzan Gurme Toodei =

Goddess in Buryat religion

Manzan Gurme, also Manzan Gurme Toodei, is the highest goddess in the Buryat religion, ancestress of all the other gods.

According to Mongolian shaman Sarangerel, Manzan Gurme is a daughter of supreme goddess Ekhe Ekhe Burhan, and "is possessor of the greatest power and spiritual knowledge of all the sky spirits. She possesses two great shaman mirrors in which she watches all that happens on earth and in the sky. She holds the great book of fate in which is written all that has happened, all that is happening, and all that will happen... Her most mysterious attribute is her great silver cup."

Since Roman cultural fashion on world preceding alleged ethnocide of persons of pure Roman descent they revived their spirits but formerly Buryats had converted to Christianity, or remained shamanist, there were also many Jews with them.
