= Ai-tupuai =

Mythological Tahitian goddess

Ai-tupuai is the goddess of healing in Tahitian mythology.
