= Ichum Lairembi =

Goddess in Sanamahism

- Khurkhul Village
- Member of Lairembi
- Affiliation: Sanamahism
- Major cult center: Khurkhul
- Gender: Female
- Region: Manipur
- Ethnic group: Meitei
- Festivals: Lai Haraoba

Ichum Lairembi (Meitei: ꯏꯆꯨꯝ ꯂꯥꯢꯔꯦꯝꯕꯤ) is a goddess in Sanamahism, the indigenous religion of Manipur. Her major cult centre of worship is located in Chakpa Khurkhul (Lois).

== Legends ==
According to legends, the power of Ichum Lairembi resides at Maram Thingbang Ngambi, which is why all the offerings brought to Ichum Lairembi are offered there.

In a legend, Princess Thoibi of Ancient Moirang was once ordered by the King of Moirang to throw an egg. So, she and her slaves proceeded to a journey to carry on the task. The egg they brought fell on ground and got broken at the area of Goddess Ichum Lairembi in Khurkhul. From that time onwards, they started to live in the place and celebrate Lai Haraoba festival to please Goddess Ichum Lairembi.

== Festival ==
Every year, the villagers offer their yearly harvest to the goddess which the villagers call the ceremony as CHAKLONG KATPA. On this very day, the villagers offer paddy, vegetables, sweets, etc. One of the most sacred practice performed on the day is SAIREN KATPA (a sacrifice usually, a pig). What made it so special about it is, the pig, during the sacrifice should not squeal. If it squeal, it is considered a bad sign for the year. Every year, boys above 21Years of age are newly registered as the member to serve the goddess, the practice is called THOU CHANBA.

The sacred Lai Haraoba festival is celebrated in honor Goddess Ichum Lairembi.(Old Manipuri: Ichum Lailempi). Among the places of celebrations of the holy festival, Khurkhul is the predominant one.

== See also ==
- Irai Leima
- Irai Ningthou
