= Chirakan-Ixmucane =

Maya creator deity

In Maya mythology, Chriakan-Ixmucane was a creator goddess formed out of four earlier creator gods. She is one of the thirteen creator deities who helped construct humanity. Other Maya stories speak of another goddess with many of Chirakan-Ixmicane's attributes, who is called Ixcuiname.
