= Ak Ana =

Religious deity

Ak Ana (Ağ Ana or Ak Ene), the "Holy Mother", is the primordial creator-goddess of Turkic people and the Khanty and Mansi peoples of Siberia. She is also known as the goddess of the water. She was the consort and daughter of Kayra Han.

Water had been created earlier than Earth. Therefore, she was believed to be the elder sister of Earth. The beginning of the Earth emanated from Water. In ancient Turkic beliefs, Tengri (God) Kaira Khan is a pure, white goose that flies constantly over an endless expanse of water (time). But before Ak-Ana appears to urge Kaira Khan to create, he experiences a disturbance of his calm. From the bottom of the Water a "sacred duck" Lura lifted the sand, clay and silt, from which the Earth was created. Water was the initial state of everything in existence. Water evenly gave rise to both foreign and hostile elements. It was the possessor of spirits and the entrance into the other realm. The life, fertility and productivity of land depended on the Ak Ana.

== Similar deities ==
1. Aka is an Anatolian river goddess / female deity.
2. Aha is a river god (or male deity) of the Sakha (Yakut) mythology.
