= List of knowledge deities =

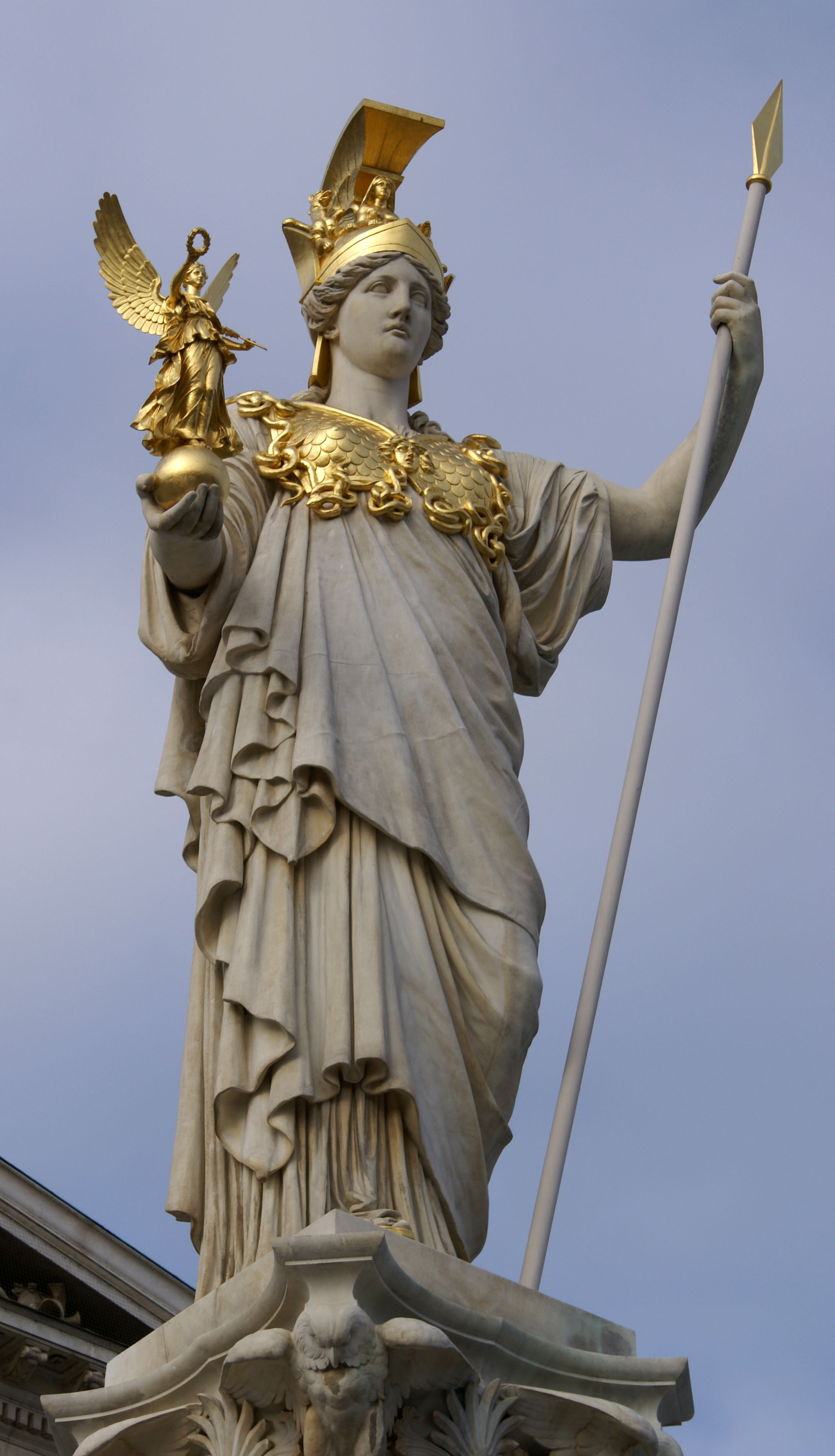
A statue of Athena, the Greek goddess of wisdom

A knowledge deity is a deity in mythology associated with knowledge, wisdom, or intelligence.

== Akan mythology ==
- Abena Motianim, goddess of wisdom, knowledge and divination.
- Anansi, an Akan folktale character associated with stories, wisdom, knowledge, and trickery, most commonly depicted as a spider.

== Ancient Egyptian mythology ==
- Neith, goddess sometimes associated with wisdom
- Thoth, originally a moon deity, later became the god of knowledge and wisdom and the scribe of the gods
- Sia, the deification of wisdom
- Isis, goddess of wisdom, magic and kingship. She was said to be "more clever than a million gods".
- Seshat, goddess of wisdom, knowledge, and writing. Scribe of the gods. Credited with the invention of writing and the alphabet. Later demoted to consort of Thoth.

== Armenian mythology ==
- Anahit, goddess of wisdom
- Tir, the god of written language, schooling, rhetoric, wisdom, and the arts

== Aztec mythology ==
- Quetzalcoatl, god of the winds, art, culture, and wisdom, as well as the patron god of learning and knowledge.

== Demonology ==
- Agares, he is associated with learning, education, teaching and languages
- Paimon, he is associated with the arts and sciences
- Furcas, he is associated with philosophy, astronomy, rhetoric and logic.
- Marbas, he is associated with mechanical arts and secret and/or hidden things.

== Maya mythology ==
- Itzamna, creator god, associated with knowledge, wisdom, writing and culture, patron god of learning and books.

== Caribbean mythology ==
- Papa Legba, loa of speech, communication, understanding, and guardian of crossroads

== Celtic mythology ==
- Ogma, a figure from Irish and Scottish mythology, said to have invented the Ogham alphabet
- Ceridwen, a figure from Welsh mythology, said to be the keeper of the cauldron of knowledge, mother of transformation and the white lady of inspiration and death.

== Chinese mythology ==
- Wenchang Wang, the god of literature and scholarship
- Kui Xing, god of examinations
- Zhuyu Xingjun, god of examination successes
- Guan Yu, god of military exams (General)
- Lu Dongbin, god of daoist inner alchemy knowledge (scholar and poet)
- Laozi, god of wisdom (philosopher)
- Bao Zheng, Star of literature (politician)
- Manjushri, the bodhisattva of wisdom

== Etruscan mythology ==
- Menrva, goddess of wisdom, war, weaving, and medicine

== Greek mythology ==
- Apollo, god of oracles, knowledge, civilization, music, healing, education, and youth
- Athena, Olympian goddess of wisdom, civilization, weaving, and war strategy
- Coeus, Titan of the inquisitive mind, his name meaning "query" or "questioning". He is the grandfather of Apollo.
- Hermes, a god of cunning
- Metis, the Titan associated most closely with wisdom and the mother of Athena, whose name in Ancient Greek described a combination of wisdom and cunning.
- Mnemosyne, Titan of memory, and one of the deities worshipped by the Cult of Asclepius in hopes that she would help supplicants remember visions
- Phoebe, a goddess of intellect

== Hindu mythology ==
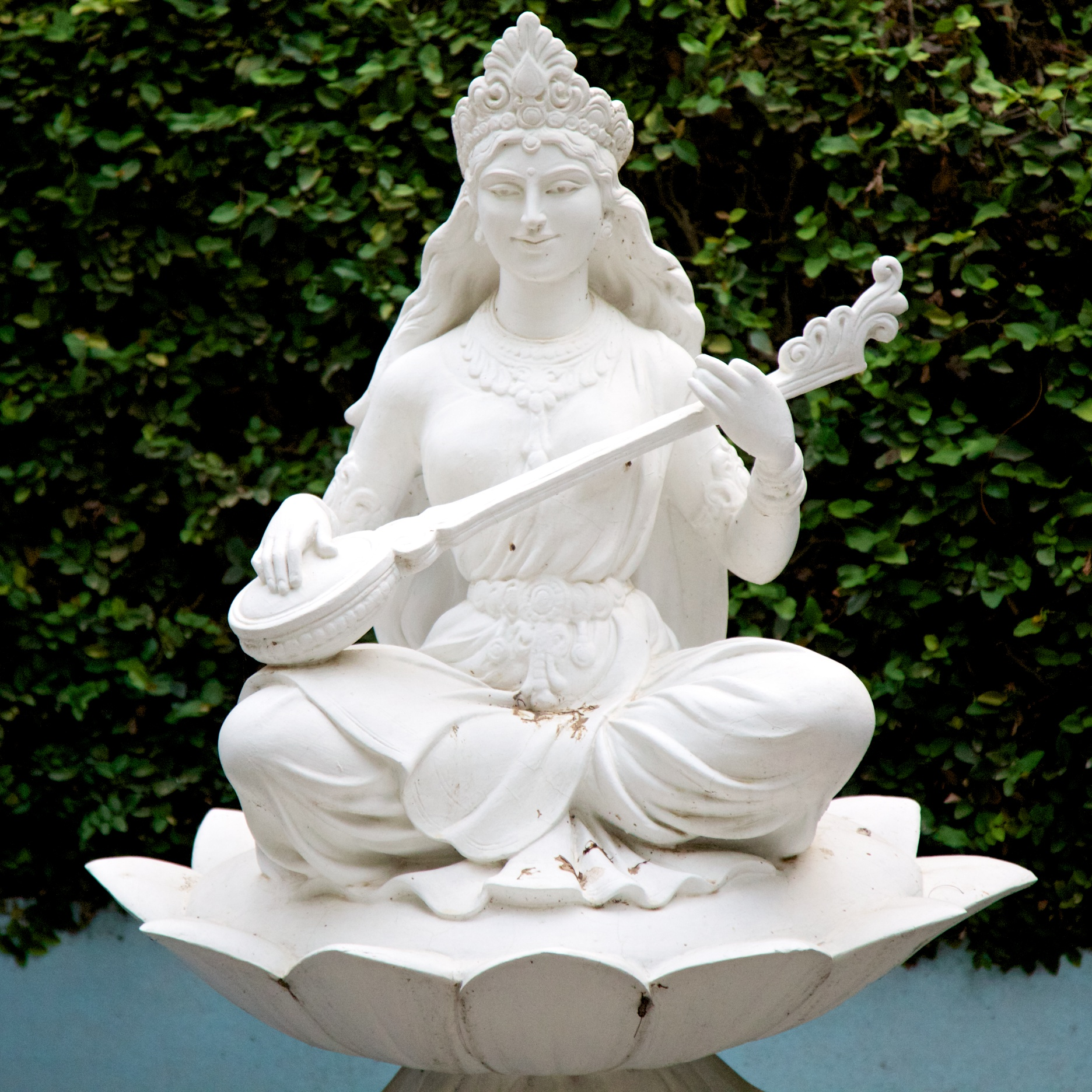
A Saraswati statue in a park.

- Saraswati, goddess of knowledge, creativity, and speech
- Ganesha, god of wisdom, luck, and new beginnings
- Kartikeya, god of war, victory, and knowledge
- Brihaspati, guru of the devas
- Shukra, guru of the asuras
- Dakshinamurti, an aspect of Shiva as the guru of sages
- Vidya Lakshmi, an aspect of Lakshmi as the bestower of knowledge
- Hayagriva, an aspect of Vishnu as the god of knowledge
- Gayatri, a form of Saraswati and the goddess of hymns
- Savitri, a form of Saraswati and goddess of wisdom

== Hittite mythology ==
- A'as, god of wisdom
- Kamrusepa

== Japanese mythology ==
- Benzaiten, a Japanese form of Saraswati, goddess of everything that flows: water, words, speech, eloquence, music and by extension, knowledge.
- Fukurokuju, god of wisdom and longevity
- Kuebiko, scarecrow god of wisdom and agriculture
- Omoikane, Shinto god of wisdom and intelligence
- Tenjin, god of scholarship

== Middle Eastern mythology ==
- Al-Kutbay, Nabataean god of knowledge and writing
- Enki, Sumerian god of intelligence, crafts, mischief, water, and creation
- Nabu, Babylonian god of wisdom and writing
- Ninimma, a minor Mesopotamian goddess regarded as the scribe and scholar of Enlil
- Nisaba, Sumerian goddess of writing, learning, and the harvest

== Muisca mythology ==
- Bochica, messenger god of knowledge

== Neoplatonism ==
- Nous, the cosmic embodiment of knowledge and intellect.

== Lakota mythology ==
- Hnašká, Lakota frog spirit of pezuota (sacred medicine)
- Hunúŋpa, Lakota bear spirit of wóksape (Lakota concept of sacred knowledge), lesser spirit of knowledge
- Iktómi, Lakota spider spirit of wóksape and trickery, greater knowledge spirit
- Kssa, Oglala spirit of knowledge, sometimes considered Iktómi before being stripped of his title
- Matȟó, Lakota mischievous healer spirit, taught the Lakota to fish
- Ptesáŋwiŋ/White buffalo calf woman, Lakota prophetess, often conflated with Wohpe
- Wiyóhiyaŋpa, Lakota wind spirit of the east, oversees new beginnings and knowledge
- Whapiya/Wóhpe, Lakota spirit of knowledge, wishes, dreams, visions, prophecy and the wife of Okaga the south wind
- Zuzéča, Lakota snake spirit of hidden knowledge and lies

== Norse mythology ==
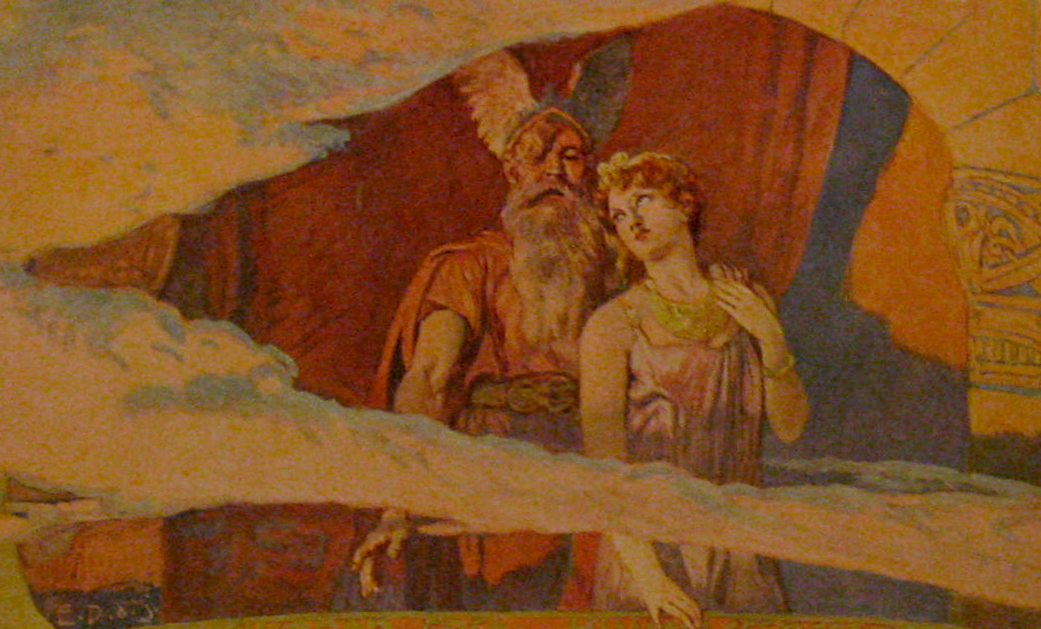
Wodan and Frea by Emil Doepler.

- Mimir, god of wisdom
- Gefjon, goddess associated with plowing, foreknowledge, and virginity.
- Odin, god of wisdom who nevertheless relentlessly keeps searching for more knowledge; associated with the runes
- Frigg, she is said to know the future, but never tells. The three following goddesses may be hypostases of her.
- Sága, goddess of wisdom
- Snotra, goddess associated with wisdom
- Vör, goddess associated with wisdom
- Numerous minor characters in Norse mythology are said to be very wise, though there's often no instance of them demonstrating this supposed wisdom:
  - Dwarfs, particularly Alviss, whose name means "all-wise". Thor keeps him from marrying his daughter by challenging him to a wisdom contest that lasts all night. He's turned to stone by the rising sun.
  - Elfs possibly
  - Heimdallr
  - Kvasir
  - Tyr
  - Utgard-Loki, while not outright stated to be wise, he's notable for being the only giant to be cleverer than the gods and getting to escape with his life
  - Vafthrudnir, a wise jotunn Odin seeks out to challenge to a wisdom contest
  - the Vanir in general

== Iranian mythology ==
- Anahita, goddess of wisdom
- Ahura Mazda, Zoroastrian god of light, benevolence, creation, truth, and perfect wisdom
- Chista, goddess of wisdom and knowledge, she leads the mortals to the right way in life and the afterlife; she is also the goddess of religion in Zoroastrian mythology.

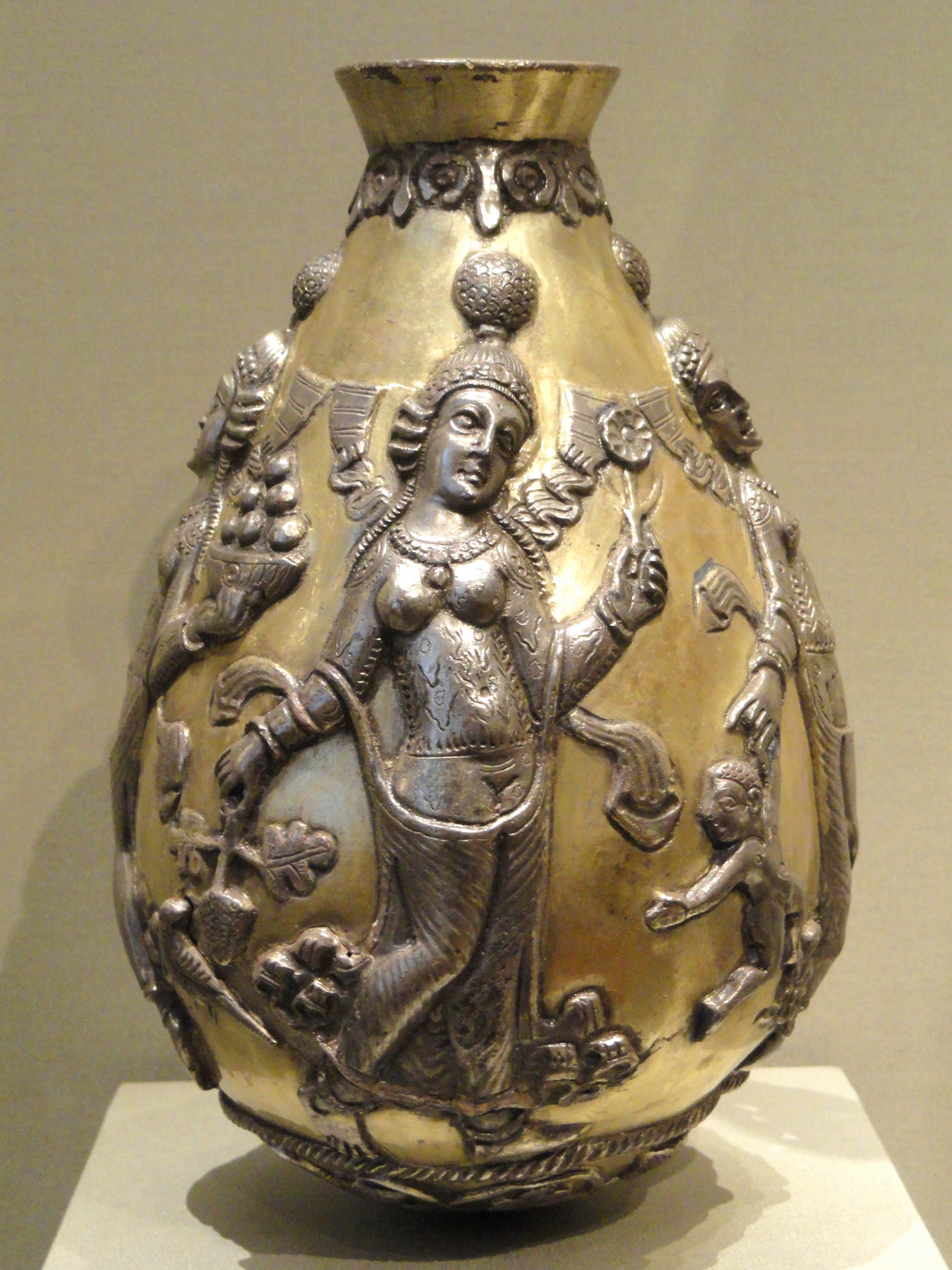
Anahita Vessel, 300-500 AD, Sasanian, Iran, silver and gilt – Cleveland Museum of Art – DSC08130

== Polynesian mythology ==
- Anulap, god of magic and knowledge
- Eijebong

== Roman mythology ==
- Egeria, a water nymph who gives wisdom and prophecy in return for libations of water or milk at her sacred grove
- Fabulinus, the god who teaches children to speak
- Minerva, goddess of wisdom, strategy, and crafts, the Roman equivalent of Athena
- Providentia, goddess of forethought
- Neptune, the god of the sea and freshwater, is said to have all the knowledge of water.

== Slavic mythology ==
- Gamayun - symbol of knowledge and wisdom
- Veles - Veles has been the most revered god in the Vedic pantheon of Slavic culture since ancient times. He is the patron saint of the interworld — both Light and Darkness are subject to him, he is also called Prophetic, Wise, because in the three worlds he manifests his power, he is the one who knows light and darkness, sets the energy of the world in motion, rotates the Universe, he is a permanent guardian on the border of the worlds, a spiritual mentor, he knows all the secrets of the universe.

== Sumerian mythology ==
- Geshtu-E, Minor god of intelligence who was sacrificed to bring forth humanity.

== Turkic mythology ==
- Mergen, deity of abundance and wisdom. Mergen symbolizes intelligence and thought.

== Vietnamese mythology ==
- Nữ thần nghề mộc, the goddess who taught mankind how to create everyday utensils.
- Văn Xương, god of exams, he holds the honor and career of those who follow the academic path.

== Yoruba mythology ==
- Ọrunmila, Irunmọlẹ of wisdom, knowledge, fate and divination.
- Ọbatala, deity of wisdom, purity, creativity and peace.
- Ọsanyin, deity of knowledge, magic, enlightenment, nature and herbalism.
- Aaja, deity of whirlwinds and forest creatures, believed to hold the secrets of botany and herbs.
