= Ranarop =

Studio album by Gjallarhorn
- Released: 1997
- Genre: Folk music
- Label: Warner Music Finland – Finlandia Records
- Producer: Vincent Högberg, Jari Tiessalo and Pekka Ruuska

Gjallarhorn chronology
Ranarop (1997)	Sjofn (2000)

Professional ratings
Review scores
Source	Rating
Allmusic	4/5 stars

Ranarop: Call of the Sea Witch was the first album by Gjallarhorn, released 1997 by Warner Music Finland.

The reworked, remixed and remastered version including an unreleased bonus track was released in November 2002. The CD was chosen "The folk music record of the year 1997" in Finland.

The Allmusic review by Heather Phares awards the album 4 stars and states " Singer/fiddler Jenny Wilhelms leads the quartet in traditional dances and ballads from the Swedish-speaking people of Finland, along with evocative instrumentals penned by the band."

== Track listing ==
1. "Intro" – 1:27
2. "Konungen och trollkvinnan (The King and the enchantress)" – 5:20
3. "Herr Olof (Master Olof)" – 4:14
4. "I fjol så (Last year)" – 3:05
5. "Solbön/Åskan (Prayer for sun/Thunder)" – 6:28
6. "O-vals (Non-Waltz)" – 3:39
7. "I riden så... (Ye ride so carefully)" – 4:28
8. "Sjöjungfrun och konungadottern (The Mermaid and the princess)" – 6:40
9. "Folkesongen (Folk song)" – 4:25
10. "Elviras vals/Oravais menuett (Elvira's waltz/Oravais minuet)" – 5:12
11. "Eldgjald (Gjalder song)" – 4:13
12. "Ramunder" – 4:05
13. "Kulning (Calling)" – 1:49
14. "Reindeer Dreaming" (bonus track) – 7:04

== Personnel ==
- Jenny Wilhelms – vocals, fiddle
- Christopher Öhman – viola, fiddle, mandola, vocals
- Tommy Mansikka-Aho – didgeridoo, percussion
- David Lillkvist – percussion
