= Sjofn (album) =

Studio album by Gjallarhorn
- Released: 2000
- Recorded: June–August 1999
- Studio: Martin Kantola Audio, Karpero, Finland
- Genre: Folk music
- Label: Vindauga
- Producer: Gjallarhorn

Gjallarhorn chronology
Ranarop (1997)	Sjofn (2000)	Grimborg (2003)

Professional ratings
Review scores
Source	Rating
Allmusic	4.5/5 stars

Sjofn is an album by Gjallarhorn, a band from Finland. It was the band's second studio album, and was released in 2000. It combines striking singing by vocalist Jenny Wilhelms with vigorous Swedish folk-style accompaniment, but with a didgeridoo as an updated drone, an unusual combination admired by critics.

== Reception ==
Steven McDonald, writing on AllMusic, described Sjofn as "a thoroughly Pagan delight of an album", explaining that it is "essentially dedicated to the goddess" Sjofn. He felt that the album was supported "quite well" by the two videos supplied on the 'enhanced' CD, specially liking the 'Suvetar' video which seems to show a fertility rite, though he also admired the 'Dejelill Och Lagerman' video which has "the local equivalent of" horned god Cernunnos/Herne watching Gjallarhorn playing in an urban environment. The CD, McDonald concludes, is "great stuff, and very, very highly recommended."

Jon Davis, reviewing the CD on exposé, calls the combination of the Australian didgeridoo and Nordic music "an inspired match", in which the "beautiful voice of Jenny Wilhelms floats over the low drone, joined by fiddle and mandola and other acoustic instruments." Davis found it hard to believe that such powerful music was made without electric or electronic instruments. He notes that the material is inspired by traditional Swedish, Icelandic and Karelian folk tunes, but that the interpretation is entirely Sjofn's. His review ends with the comment that he had great difficulty tearing himself away to review any other music.

Peggy Latkovich, reviewing Sjofn on Rootsworld, describes Gjallarhorn as a quartet "who delve deep into the earth for their wild, unfettered sound". While in her view much of the music has a tribal quality, its roots are wholly Scandinavian. The melodies, mainly newly composed, in her opinion "meld beautifully with the texts". She finds that while it has "an untamed earth spirit" throughout, it is " a meticulously crafted piece of work."

Russell W. Elliot, reviewing Sjofn for Musical Discoveries, wrote that they thoroughly enjoyed the album, which would appeal to world music lovers. Elliot noted the way that the combinations of parts in the various tracks complemented each other: the fiddle and Wilhelms's vocals in "Dance a Little"; the sea and dolphin backing sounds on "Dolphin Calling"; "layers of choir swirling over Jew's harp" in "Su Ru Ruskadirei"; and the "Gjallarhorn-characteristic" didgeridoo with layers of Wilhelms's vocals on "Goddess of Spring".

== Support ==
The album was brought out with the help of Finlands Svenska Folkmusikinstitut (Finland's Swedish Folk Music Institute) and Svenska Kulturfonden (The Swedish Culture Fund). The Folk Music Institute described the disk as having the goddess Sjofn as observer, the texts dealing with love meetings and spring rituals.

== Track listing ==
1. "Suvetar (Goddess of Spring)" – 5:14
2. "Tova och Konungen (Tova and the King)" – 4:20
3. "Dejelill Och Lagerman" – 3:23
4. "Menuett from Jeppo (Polska) – Intro" – 1:05
5. "Menuett from Jeppo (Polska)" – 3:12
6. "Kom Helge Ande (Come, Holy Spirit)"
7. "Näcken och Jungfrun (The Water-Sprite and the Maiden)" – 3:15
8. "Su Ru Ruskadirej" – 3:55
9. "Bergfäst (Mountain Haunted)" 7:41
10. "Oravaismenuett (Oravais Minuet)" – 3:33
11. "Lille Dansa (Dance a Little)" – 2:46
12. "Hjaðningaríma (Heathen Song)" – 2:26
13. "Sinivatsa (Dolphin Calling)" – 7:37

== Personnel ==
- Jenny Wilhelms – vocals, fiddle
- Christopher Öhman – vocals, viola, mandola, kalimba
- Tommy Mansikka-Aho – harp, didgeridoo, djembe, udu drum
- David Lillkvist – drums, bongos, congas, darabuka, cymbals, djembe, kalimba, shaker, surdo, tambourine, triangle, udu drum, chimes
- Sara Puljula – acoustic bass
