= Rimfaxe (album) =

Studio album by Gjallarhorn
- Released: Jul 24, 2006
- Genre: Folk music
- Label: Westpark Access
- Producer: Martin Kantola

Gjallarhorn chronology
Grimborg (2003)	Rimfaxe (2006)

Professional ratings
Review scores
Source	Rating
Allmusic	3/5 stars

Rimfaxe is the fourth album by the Finnish group Gjallarhorn and was released in 2006.

== Reception ==
Allmusic awarded the album with 3 stars and its review by Chris Nickson States: "Throughout, the traditional material is superb, drawing sometimes on the tradition of the Swedes in Finland, but casting its net all across the Nordic countries. Their sound is unique, a curious mix of instruments that work well together, and there's an obvious reverence for the music they're playing."

== Track listing ==
1. "Rimfaxe (Rimemane)" — 4:00
2. "Kokkovirsi (Bonfire Song)" — 3:28
3. "Systrarna (The Sisters)" — 6:11
4. "Blacken [Grey & Frost Club Mix]" — 6:25
5. "Hymn (Hymn)" — 6:59
6. "Sylvklar (Silverbright)" — 5:04
7. "Norafjelds (Mountain Poem)" — 6:56
8. "Ivall (@ley)" — 4:46
9. "Taklax 1037" — 2:59
10. "Taklax 1034" — 3:36
11. "Staffan (Stephen)" — 4:48
12. "Graning (Dawn)" — 3:38

== Personnel ==
- Jenny Wilhelms - vocals, fiddle
- Adrian Jones - viola, mandola
- Peter Berndalen - percussion
- Göran Månsson - subcontra bass recorder
