= Grimborg =

Studio album by Gjallarhorn
- Released: 2003
- Genre: Folk music
- Label: NorthSide Records
- Producer: Patrick Lax; Martin Kantola; Jenny Wilhelms

Gjallarhorn chronology
Sjofn (2000)	Grimborg (2003)	Rimfaxe (2006)

Professional ratings
Review scores
Source	Rating
Allmusic	4.5/5 stars

Grimborg is the third studio album by the Finnish folk/world music group Gjallarhorn, released in 2003.

== Track listing ==
1. "Konungadöttrarna" (The King's daughters) – 4:55
2. "Grimborg" – 4:03
3. "Tora Lille" (Little Tora) – 4:01
4. "Polonaise" – 3:44
5. "Menuett" – 2:10
6. "Njawara" – 2:43
7. "Herr Olof" (Sir Olof) – 5:39
8. "Ella Lilla" (Dear Ella) – 5:14
9. "Ack Lova Gud" (Oh, Praise the Lord) – 4:28
10. "Frøysnesen / Soteroen" – 4:36
11. "Vallevan" – 4:31
12. "Kulning" (Cow calling) – 5:30
13. "Längtaren" – 2:59

== Critical reception ==
The Allmusic review by Chris Nickson awards the album 4.5 stars and states "There's nothing like the pleasure one can get from hearing a band take a quantum leap in its development, and with the very purplish Grimborg (just look at the cover), Gjallarhorn has made theirs."

== Personnel ==
- Jenny Wilhelms – vocals, violin, Hardanger fiddle
- Adrian Jones – viola, mandola
- Tommy Mansikka-Aho – didgeridoo, slideridoo, Jews harp, udu, djembe, berimbau, shaman drum
- Sara Puljula – bass, percussion
