= Vár =

Norse deity

In Norse mythology, Vár (Old Norse, meaning either "pledge" or "beloved") is a goddess associated with oaths and agreements. Vár is attested in the Poetic Edda, compiled in the 13th century from earlier traditional sources; the Prose Edda, written in the 13th century by Snorri Sturluson; and kennings found in skaldic poetry and a runic inscription. Scholars have proposed theories about the implications of the goddess.

== Attestations ==
In the Poetic Edda poem Þrymskviða, the blessing of Vár is invoked by the jötunn Þrymr after his "bride" (who is actually the god Thor disguised as the goddess Freyja) is hallowed with the stolen hammer of Thor, Mjöllnir, at their wedding:

Benjamin Thorpe translation: Then said Thrym, the Thursars's lord: Bring the hammer in, the bride to consecrate; lay Miöllnir on the maiden's knee; unite us each with other by the hand of Vár.	Henry Adams Bellows translation: Then loud spake Thrym, the giants' leader: "Bring in the hammer to hallow the bride; On the maiden's knees let Mjollnir lie, That us both the hand of Var may bless."

In the chapter 35 of the Prose Edda book Gylfaginning, High tells Gangleri (described as king Gylfi in disguise) about the ásynjur. High lists Vár ninth among the sixteen ásynjur he presents in the chapter and provides some information about her:

Ninth Var: she listens to people's oaths and private agreements that women and men make between each other. Thus these contracts are called varar. She also punishes those who break them.

In addition, Vár appears twice more in the Poetic Edda. In chapter 75 of the Prose Edda book Skáldskaparmál Vár appears within a list of 27 ásynjur names. In chapter 87 the name Vár is employed in a kenning referring to the goddess Skaði ("bow-string-Vár") in the poem Haustlöng by the skald Þjóðólfr of Hvinir. A runic inscription inscribed on a stick from Bergen, Norway around the year 1300 records a common mercantile transaction followed by a verse from a displeased scribe that mentions Vár (edits applied per the translator's notes):

'Wise Var of wire ["woman of filigree," meaning "wise bejeweled woman"] makes (me) sit unhappy.
Eir [woman] of mackerels' ground [likely gold] takes often and much sleep from me.'

Mindy Macleod and Bernard Mees posit that the first line of the inscription essentially means "women make me miserable" or potentially "marriage makes me miserable," whereas the second line means "women often take a lot of sleep from me."

== Theories ==
Regarding the ceremonial marital reference to Vár in Þrymskviða, Andy Orchard opines that "the antiquity of such a ritual is far from clear." Britt-Mari Näsström argues that, like many other minor goddesses, Vár was originally one of Freyja's names, "later apprehended as independent goddesses."

Rudolf Simek says that the goddesses Sága, Hlín, Sjöfn, Snotra, Vár, and Vör should be considered vaguely defined figures who "should be seen as female protective goddesses" that are all responsible for "specific areas of the private sphere, and yet clear differences were made between them so that they are in many ways similar to matrons."
