= Sjöfn (disambiguation) =

Sjöfn is a Norse goddess. Sjöfn may also refer to:

- Sigrún Sjöfn Ámundadóttir (born 1988), Icelandic basketball player
- Sjofn (album), 2000 album by the Finnish band Gjallarhorn
