= Snotra =

Norse deity

In Norse mythology, Snotra (Old Norse: [ˈsnotrɑ], "clever") is a goddess associated with wisdom. Snotra is attested in the Prose Edda, written in the 13th century by Snorri Sturluson. Scholars have proposed theories about the implications of the goddess.

A character named Snotra also appears in a darkly comedic tale at the start of Gautreks saga, in which she is a human woman, the youngest daughter in a family of foolish farmers. Her parents in this story are called Skafnörtungr ('Skinflint') and Tötra ('Tatters'), and she has three brothers (Fjolmod, Imsigull, and Gilling) and two sisters (Hjotra and Fjotra). The family is visited by King Gauti of West Gotaland, the eponymous ancestor of the Geats and Goths, by whom Snotra becomes pregnant with Gautrek.

== Attestations ==
In chapter 35 of the Prose Edda book Gylfaginning, High provides brief descriptions of 16 ásynjur. High lists Snotra thirteenth, and says that Snotra "is wise and courteous". In addition, High adds that, after Snotra's name, a wise man or woman can be called snotr. In the Prose Edda book Skáldskaparmál, Snotra is included among a list of 27 ásynjur names. Apart from these two sources, Snotra is otherwise unattested.

== Reception ==
Andy Orchard and Rudolf Simek state that, as Snotra is unattested beyond the Prose Edda, Snotra may be an invention of Snorri's. Orchard theorizes that, otherwise, Snorri may have had access to a lost source, and that the little information Snorri presents may be derived from the meaning of her name.

Beowulf's author used word "snotra," for 'wise,' 'prudent'

Simek says that Snorri may have invented Snotra from the Old Norse word snotr ("clever") and "placed [her] next to other insignificant goddesses." However, Simek also writes that the goddesses Snotra, Sága, Hlín, Sjöfn, Vár, and Vör should be considered vaguely defined figures who "should be seen as female protective goddesses" that are all responsible for "specific areas of the private sphere, and yet clear differences were made between them so that they are in many ways similar to matrons."
