= Gjallarhorn (band) =

Finnish band

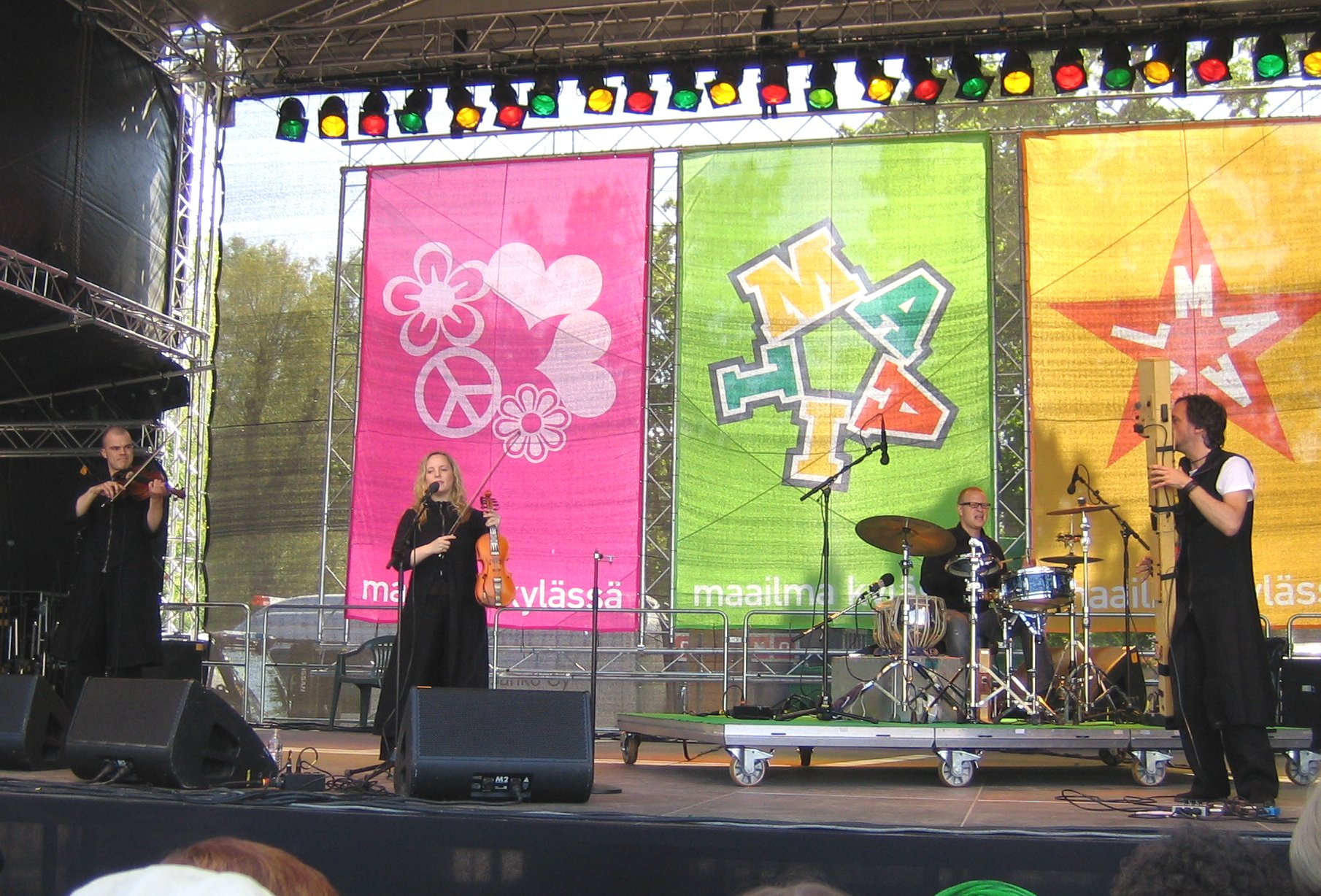
- Gjallarhorn in 2007

Background information
- Origin: South Ostrobothnia, Finland
- Genres: Folk rock, Finnish rock
- Years active: 1994–present
- Members: Petter Berndalen (percussion) (2004– ) Adrian Jones (viola, mandola, kalimba) (2000–); Göran Månsson (flutes, recorders, sub contrabass recorder) (2005– ) Jenny Wilhelms (vocals, fiddle and hardangerfiddle) (1994– )
- Past members: Jakob Frankenhaeuser (didgeridoo) (1994–1996); David Lillkvist (percussion) (1996–2002); Tommy Mansikka-Aho (didgeridoo, slideridoo and jaw harp) (1996–2004); Christopher Öhman (viola, mandola)(1994–2000); Sara Puljula (percussion) (2002–2003)

Gjallarhorn (Swedish pronunciation: [ˈjâlːarˌhuːɳ], Finland Swedish: [ˈjɑlːɑrˌhuːrn]) is a Finnish band that performs folk rock with roots in the folk music of Finland and Sweden. The group was formed in 1994. The band's music echoes the ancient folk music tradition of Scandinavia with medieval ballads, minuets, prayers in runo-metric chanting and ancient Icelandic rímur epics in a modern way. The group is named after the Gjallarhorn associated with the god Heimdallr from the Norse mythology.

== The music ==
The band is Finnish and hails from Ostrobothnia, a Swedish-speaking region on the west coast of Finland, one of the four regions of the historical province of Ostrobothnia and the only region in Finland outside Åland where more people speak Swedish rather than Finnish.

The music of the band remains Swedish in character. Most of their repertoire is the acoustic folk music of these Swedish-speaking Finns, from the unique minuets and ballads that have only survived in Ostrobothnia, to the old traditional waltzes. The didgeridoo and sub-contrabass recorder offer an underlying drone, a technique shared by some other Nordic bands such as Garmarna. Also notable is their use of the hardanger fiddle and Jenny Wilhelms' kulning, a high-pitched, wordless vocal technique based on traditional Scandinavian cattle-herding calls.

== History ==
Gjallarhorn was formed in 1994 on the west coast of Finland, in the Swedish speaking area, by Jenny Wilhelms, Christopher Öhman (viola, mandola) and Jacob Frankenhaeuser (didgeridoo). The band started as a trio but became a quartet with percussion in 1996. The band has been a quartet ever since.

In 1997 the first CD Ranarop was released. The group was selected "Folk music group of the year 1997" and the CD was "Folk music CD of the year 1997" in Finland. In 1998 the band started touring frequently on a professional basis with performances at international world, folk and jazz music festivals. Gjallarhorn has toured in Europe, United States, Australia, New Zealand, Canada and Japan.

The second CD Sjofn was released in 2000 and the third CD Grimborg in 2002. In 2003 Grimborg was awarded the French "Academie Charles Cros" prize for world music and Gjallarhorn was nominated for the music prize of the Nordic Council of Ministries.

In 2004 the band made a 10th anniversary tour, and the Swedish Cultural Fund of Finland selected the band with Jenny Wilhelms for their annual honor award, given to artists in different fields of cultural and educational work.

In 2005 the band started working on new material. The fourth album Rimfaxe was released in 2006. The album was mixed in the US by Bruce Swedien. The didgeridoo was replaced by Göran Månsson's sub contrabass recorder as the drone effect and bass of the band.

== Band members ==
The current members of the band are:

- Sebastian Åberg, percussion (2006– )
- Adrian Jones, viola, mandola, kalimba (2000– )
- Göran Månsson, flutes, recorders, sub contrabass recorder (2005– )
- Jenny Wilhelms, vocals, fiddle and hardangerfiddle (1994– )
- Martin Kantola, sound (1996– )

=== Former members ===
- Jakob Frankenhaeuser, didgeridoo (1994–1996)
- David Lillkvist, percussion (1996–2002)
- Tommy Mansikka-Aho, didgeridoo, slideridoo and jaw harp (1996–2004)
- Christopher Öhman, viola, mandola (1994–2000)
- Sara Puljula, percussion (2002–2003)
- Petter Berndalen, percussion (2004–2006)

== Discography ==
=== Albums ===
- Ranarop, 1997 (original); 2002 (remastered)
- Sjofn, 2000
- Grimborg, 2003
- Rimfaxe, 2006
