= Ligobubfanu =

Creator goddess on Truk in Micronesia

Ligobubfanu is a creator goddess in the mythology of the island of Truk in Micronesia.

She is the wife of the sky god Anulap. Their son was Lugeilan, and their grandson was Olifat.
