= Motikitik =

In Micronesian mythology, Motikitik is a mythological hero, famous for his fishing feats.
