= Kormáks saga =

Icelandic saga

Kormáks saga (Old Norse pronunciation: [ˈkʰorˌmɒːks ˈsaɣa], Icelandic pronunciation: [ˈkʰɔrˑmauks ˈsaːɣa]) is one of the Icelanders' sagas. The saga was probably written during the first part of the 13th century.

Though the saga is believed to have been among the earliest sagas composed, it is well preserved. The unknown author clearly relies on oral tradition and seems unwilling to add much of his own or even to fully integrate the different accounts he knew of Kormák. Often, he does little more than briefly set the scenes for Kormák's stanzas, with the declarations of love often contrasting with the skald's antagonizing actions. The only complete version of the saga is found in the Icelandic manuscript Möðruvallabók AM 132 fol.

The saga tells of the tenth-century Icelandic poet Kormak Ogmundsson (Kormákr Ögmundarson) and of the love of his life, Steingerd Torkelsdottir (Steingerðr Þórkelsdóttir), to whom he is betrothed. Due to a curse, he arrives too late for his wedding with Steingerðr, who marries another. Kormak then follows King Harald Greycloak to Ireland. Later, in Scotland, he loses his life in a battle with a wizard. The saga preserves a significant number of poems attributed to Kormak, many of them dealing with his love for Steingerd.

== Kormák's love poems ==
The following stanzas, in which Kormak recalls the first time he met Steingerd, represent the style and content of his love poems.Read aloud.

Brunnu beggja kinna	The bright lights of both	Brightly beamed the lights-of-
bjǫrt ljós á mik drósar,	her cheeks burned onto me	both-her-cheeks upon me—
oss hlœgir þat eigi,	from the fire-hall's felled wood;	e'er will I recall it—
eldhúss of við felldan;	no cause of mirth for me in that.	o'er the heaped-up wood-pile;
enn til ǫkkla svanna	By the threshold I gained a glance	and the instep saw I
ítrvaxins gatk líta,	at the ankles of this girl	of the shapely woman—
þrǫ́ muna oss of ævi	of glorious shape; yet while I live	no laughing matter, lo! my
eldask, hjá þreskeldi.	that longing will never leave me.	longing—by the threshold.
Brámáni skein brúna	The moon of her eyelash—that valkyrie	Brightly shone the beaming
brims und ljósum himni	adorned with linen, server of herb-surf—	brow-moons of the goodly
Hristar hǫrvi glæstrar	shone hawk-sharp upon me	lady linen-dight, how
haukfránn á mik lauka;	beneath her brows' bright sky;	like a hawk's, upon me;
en sá geisli sýslir	but that beam from the eyelid-moon	but that beam from forehead's-
síðan gullmens Fríðar	of the goddess of the golden torque	bright-hued-orbs, I fear me,
hvarmatungls ok hringa	will later bring trouble to me	of the Eir-of-gold doth
Hlínar óþurft mína.	and to the ring goddess herself.	ill spell for us later.
— Einar Ól. Sveinsson's edition	— Rory McTurk's translation	— Lee M. Hollander's adaptation

== Other sources ==
- Einar Ól. Sveinsson (Ed.) (1939). Íslenzk fornrit VIII - Vatnsdœla saga. Reykjavík: Hið íslenzka fornritafélag.
- Hollander, Lee M. (Ed.) (1949). The Sagas of Kormák and The Sworn Brothers. Princeton: Princeton University Press.
- Viðar Hreinsson (Ed.) (1997). The Complete Sagas of Icelanders, Volume 1. Reykjavík: Leifur Eiríksson Publishing. ISBN 9979-9293-1-6.
