= Hlín =

Norse deity

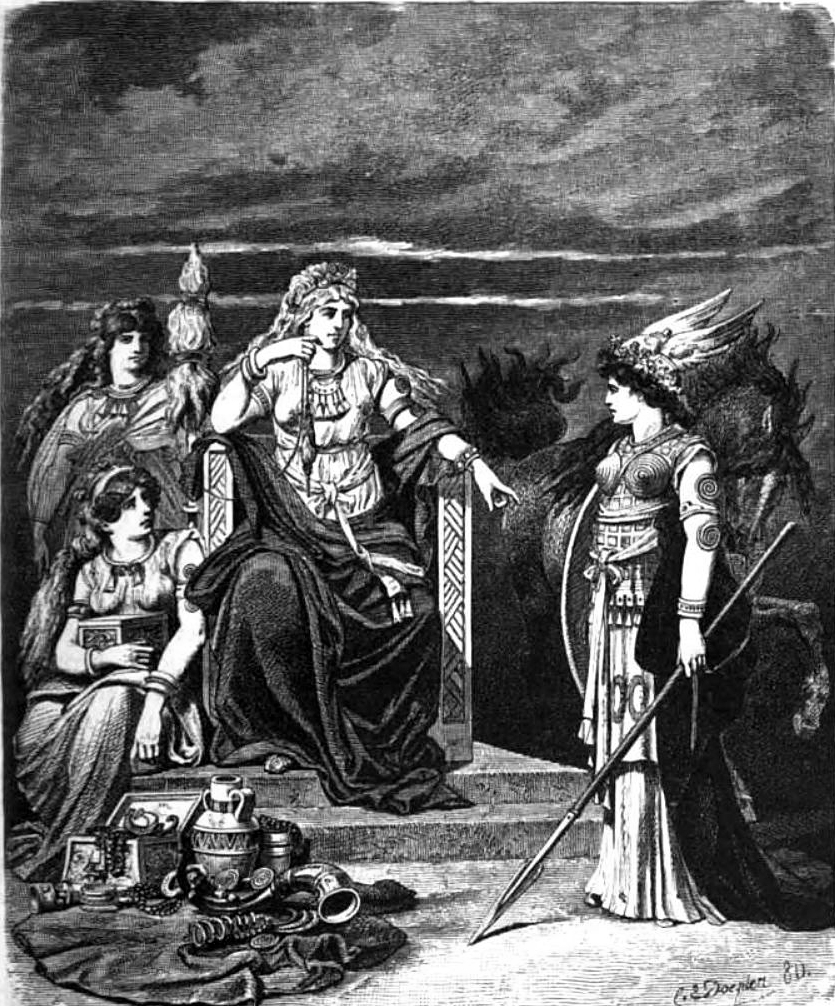
The goddess Frigg sits on her throne, accompanied by two goddesses: Fulla, holding a wooden box, and Hlín, standing and observing everything. Facing them are the warrior goddess Gná and her horse Hófvarpnir. Illustration by Carl Emil Doepler (1882).

In Norse mythology, Hlín is a goddess associated with the goddess Frigg. Hlín appears in a poem in the Poetic Edda, compiled in the 13th century from earlier traditional sources, the Prose Edda, written in the 13th century by Snorri Sturluson, and in kennings found in skaldic poetry. Scholars have debated whether the stanza referring to her in the Prose Edda refers to Frigg. Hlín serves as a given name in Iceland, and Hlín receives veneration in the modern era in Germanic paganism's modern extension, Heathenry.

== Etymology ==
Scholars frequently explain the meaning behind the goddess's name as 'protector'. The Prose Edda section Gylfaginning derives the name from a verb found in a proverb in an obscure and otherwise unattested Old Norse proverb: Þiaðan af er þat orðtak at sá er forðask hleinir. Scholars generally accept that the theonym Hlín derives from the verb hleina. However, the verb hleina in which the section claims a derivation is obscure (a hapax legomenon), and translators have attempted to work around it in a variety of manners, in some cases leaving the verb untranslated. Examples include the translations of Anthony Faulkes ("From this comes the saying that someone who escapes finds refuge (hleinir)", 1995 [1987]) and Jesse Byock ("From her name comes the expression that he who escapes finds hleinir [peace and quiet]", 2005).

Scholars have proposed a variety of derivations for the verb. The verb is most commonly linked to Old English hlinian and hlænan, ancestors to the modern English verb lean. 19th century scholars, including Jacob Grimm, linked hleina to the rare Old Norse noun hlynr, meaning 'maple tree'. Grimm links this derivation to a variety of tree figures found in folklore from the modern era in northwest Europe. Joseph Hopkins (2017) comments that this derivation may deserve further investigation in light of the potential connection between the Old Norse goddess name Ilmr and the Old Norse common noun almr (Elm tree), and says that "the potential of a protective tree goddess brings to mind a mysterious passage in the Prose Edda involving the rowan, in which the tree is referred to as [Thor's] bjǫrg ['aid, help, salvation, rescue']".

== Attestations ==
In the Poetic Edda poem Völuspá, Hlín receives a mention regarding the foretold death of the god Odin during the immense battle waged at Ragnarök:

Then is fulfilled Hlín's
second sorrow,
when Óðinn goes
to fight with the wolf,
and Beli's slayer,
bright, against Surtr.
Then shall Frigg's
sweet friend fall.

The death of Odin (the stanza's "second sorrow") implies a first death. Scholars all but universally view this as a reference to the death of the god Baldr, Frigg and Odin's son. Some translators replace the reference of Hlín to a mention of Frigg due to their interpretations of the stanza (see discussion in Scholarly reception and interpretation section below).

In chapter 35 of the Prose Edda book Gylfaginning, Hlín is listed twelfth among a series of sixteen goddesses. High tells Gangleri (earlier in the book described as King Gylfi in disguise) that Hlín "is given the function of protecting people whom Frigg wishes to save from some danger." High continues that, from this, comes the saying that "someone who escapes finds refuge (hleinar)." The verb hleina in this passage is obscure and has yielded a variety of translations (see etymology section above).

In chapter 51, the above-mentioned Völuspá stanza is quoted. In chapter 75 of the book Skáldskaparmál Hlín appears within a list of 27 ásynjur names.

In skaldic poetry, the name Hlín is frequent in kennings for women. Examples include Hlín hringa ('Hlín of rings'), Hlín goðvefjar ('Hlín of velvet') and arm-Hlín ('arm-Hlín'). The name is already used frequently in this way by the 10th-century poet Kormákr Ögmundarson and remains current in skaldic poetry through the following centuries, employed by poets such as Þórðr Kolbeinsson, Gizurr Þorvaldsson and Einarr Gilsson. The name remained frequently used in woman kennings in rímur poetry, sometimes as Lín.

In a verse in Hávarðar saga Ísfirðings, the phrase á Hlín fallinn ("fallen on Hlín") occurs. Some editors have emended the line while others have accepted the reading and taken Hlín to refer to the earth.

== Modern influence ==
In line with a cultural practice to use Old Norse theonyms as personal names, Hlín appears as a given name for females in Iceland. Like other goddesses from the North Germanic corpus, Hlín receives veneration in Heathenry.

== Scholarly reception and interpretation ==
Although the Prose Edda identifies Hlín as a separate goddess than Frigg, many scholars identify Hlín as another name for Frigg. For example, Andy Orchard says that in Völuspá, Hlín appears to be just another name for Frigg, and adds that "the numerous occurrences of the name in skaldic poetry in poetic periphrases or kennings for women do nothing to dispel the confusion." Rudolf Simek agrees that Hlín seems to appear as another name for Frigg in Völuspá, and that in skaldic poetry Hlín was a well-known mythological figure by the 10th century. Simek states that Hlín is likely simply another name for Frigg, and that Snorri "misunderstood her to be a goddess in her own right in his reading of the Völuspá stanza."

However, in the same work, Simek also says that the goddesses Sága, Hlín, Sjöfn, Snotra, Vár, and Vör should be considered vaguely defined figures who "should be seen as female protective goddesses" that are all responsible for "specific areas of the private sphere, and yet clear differences were made between them so that they are in many ways similar to matrons."

Some scholars express uncertainty at identifying Hlín as another name for Frigg, and others reject the identification altogether. In a 2017 paper on the topic, Hopkins agrees with Simek's comparison to the matrons and compares the scholarly reception of the goddess Fulla, another goddess closely associated with Frigg, to that of Hlín:

"Like Hlín, the name Fulla ['full, bountiful'] may be tempting to dismiss as a reading error on the part of a Prose Edda author or as a poetic invention ... Were it not for the preservation of the cognate theonym Volla in the Second Merseburg Charm, Fulla would remain in a similarly ambiguous position like that of Hlín, easily overlooked, dismissed, or deconstructed ... the correlations between the Prose Edda and the Second Merseburg Incantation provide something of a cautionary tale: namely, by dismissing information found solely in the Prose Edda, one risks violating the foundational maxim of absence of evidence is not evidence of absence. There is no reason to doubt that Hlín was an independent entity in Old Norse mythology and no positive evidence to suggest that Hlín was merely a by-name of Frigg."

Referencing the iconography of the early Germanic matrons, Hopkins proposes an alternate reading of the Völuspá stanza in line with the Gylfaginning description of the goddess. In Hopkins's reading of the stanza, Hlín's sorrows are her inability to protect figures close to Frigg: the first sorrow would therefore be the death of Baldr, and the second sorrow the foretold death of Odin.

== See also ==
- Ilmr, an Old Norse goddess whose name may mean 'elm tree'
- Sacred trees and groves in Germanic paganism and mythology
