= Ilmr =

Norse deity

Ilmr (Old Norse) is a figure in Norse mythology who is listed as a goddess and who occurs in skaldic kennings. Her associations and original nature are unknown.

Ilmr is attested at two points in the so-called Nafnaþulur appended to the Prose Edda book Skáldskaparmál: between Iðunn and Bil in a list of ásynjur, and in a list of words that can be used in kennings for "woman". No further information other than her name is provided. She is not mentioned in Eddic poetry, but her name does occur several times in skaldic poetry of the 10th and 11th centuries, particularly in verses by Kormákr Ǫgmundarson.

It is impossible to determine the associations of the goddess Ilmr. Jacob Grimm pointed out that while the goddess name Ilmr is feminine, the masculine word ilmr means "pleasant scent" (suavis odor); an association with scent would be unique among Norse deities. Kormákr, at least, used valkyrie-names as well as goddess-names in forming kennings referring to women, and it is possible that he thought of Ilmr as a valkyrie; one other kenning using her name, in a verse preserved in Landnamabók and attributed to Hrómundr halti, is of a type (kennings for battle formed with a female name) that is only attested with names of valkyries. In his 1989 etymological dictionary of Icelandic, Ásgeir Blöndal Magnússon suggested that this might indicate the name Ilmr was related to the noun jalmr (noise) with which it is coupled in the kenning; this is a known type of valkyrie-name. Eir, Þrúðr, and the norn Skuld are other female figures variously identified as valkyries and goddesses within the Old Norse corpus. Alternatively, Ásgeir Blöndal Magnússon suggests Ilmr is a tree dís, with a name etymologically related to almr, elm. The elm is associated in folklore in many nations with death, which might have led to her being classed as a valkyrie.

== See also ==
- Hlín, a Norse goddess whose name some scholars have suggested may mean 'maple tree'
- Sacred trees and groves in Germanic paganism and mythology
