= Nei Tituaabine =

Nei Tituaabine, is a red-haired maiden with eyes bright as lighting in Micronesian mythology, specifically in Kiribati. Her appearance in mythology is heralded by a flash of lightning.

She fell in love with the giant, red-haired chief, Auriaria, but they had no children. After her death, three trees grew from her grave: a coconut from her head, a pandanus from her heels, and an almond from her navel. She became a tree goddess.
