= Uekera =

In the Micronesian mythology of Kiribati (formerly the Gilbert Islands) Uekera is a tree that reaches to the heavens; Te Kaintikuaba which is translated as the "tree of life" or "tree of knowledge" in Kiribati legend. It is said to have been planted in Buariki village in North Tarawa by Nei Tekanuea. The creation story is that spirits who lived in Te Kaintikuaba in Samoa, migrated northward carrying branches from the tree and created the islands of Tungaru (the Gilberts). (Note: Sir Arthur Grimble, cadet administrative officer in the Gilberts from 1914 and resident commissioner of the Gilbert and Ellice Islands colony from 1926, recorded the myths and oral traditions of the Kiribati people. He wrote the best-sellers A Pattern of Islands (London, John Murray 1952, and Return to the Islands (1957), which was republished by Eland, London in 2011, ISBN 978-1-906011-45-1. He also wrote Tungaru Traditions: writings on the atoll culture of the Gilbert Islands, University of Hawaiʻi Press, Honolulu, 1989, ISBN 0-8248-1217-4.) It is the inspiration for the name of the Kiribati weekly newspaper, Te Uekera.

== See also ==
- World tree
