= Nareau =

Creator deity of Gilbert Islands

Nareau (Gilbertese: "spider lord") is the creator deity in the mythology of the Gilbert Islands. From sand and water, Nareau created two primeval beings, Na Atibu and Nei Teueke. Together they brought forth several deities: Te Ikawai, Nei Marena, Te Nao (the wave), Na Kika (the octopus), and Ruki (the eel). Eventually, Na Atibu was torn apart and his body parts became the world. Either Naraeu himself or a younger god with the same name created the sun and moon from Na Atibu's eyes, the stars from his brains, and the land from his bones and flesh.
