= Geiravör =

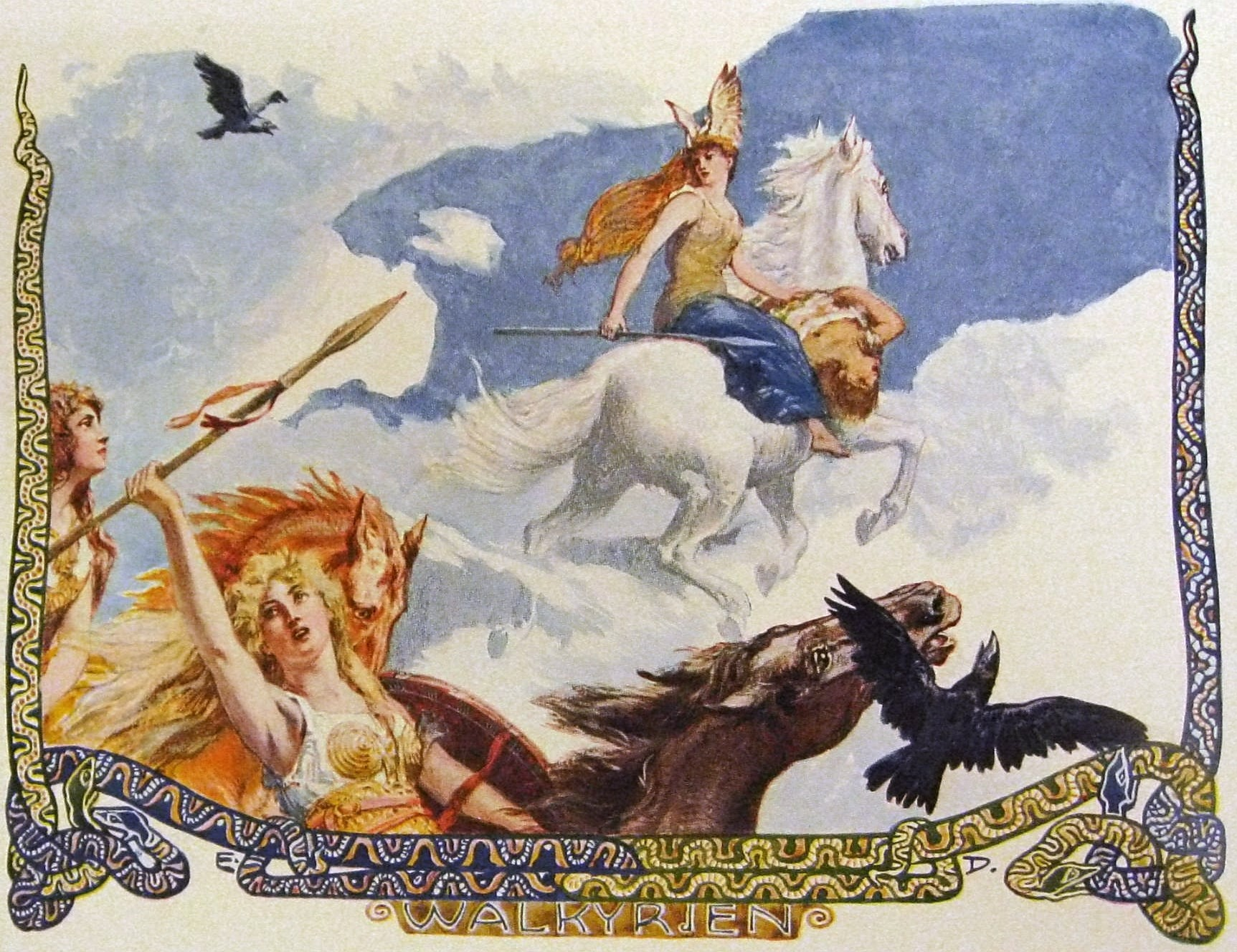
"Walkyrien" (1905) by Emil Doepler.

In Norse mythology, Geiravör (Old Norse: Geiravǫr, "spear-vǫr") is a valkyrie attested in the longer of the two Nafnaþulur lists found in the Prose Edda.

According to Rudolf Simek, the section part of the name—vör—may be identical to the name of the Norse goddess Vör, and would therefore mean "spear-goddess"; or the suffix may simply reflect the suffix vör that appears in personal names such as Geirvör and Hervör.
