= Na Atibu =

I-Kiribati god

Na Atibu is a god in the mythology of the Gilbert Islands. The spider god Nareau created Na Atibu and his female counterpart Nei Teukez out of sand and water. A sacred tree called kai-n-tiku-aba grew from Na Atibu's spine, and men and women grew from the tree like fruits. One man, Kouri-aba, shook the tree in anger, causing all the people to fall to earth and become scattered.

Na Atibu and Nei Teukez gave birth to several gods, one of which was Nareau the younger. Na Abitu allowed Nareau to kill him and tear him apart so that his body parts could be used to create the world. His right eye became the sun, his left eye the moon, his brains became the stars, and his bones and flesh became the islands and trees.

== See also ==
- Ymir, subject of a similar myth in Norse mythology
