= Auriaria =

In the mythology of Kiribati, Auriaria is a red-haired giant chieftain and demigod from Samoa.

According to legend, Auriaria fell in love with the beautiful red-haired woman, Nei Tituaabine, but had no children. She died, and from her grave grew three trees: a coconut from her head, a pandanus from her heels and an almond from her navel. She became a tree goddess.
