= Kormákr Ögmundarson =

10th-century Icelandic poet

Kormákr Ögmundarson (Old Norse: Kormákr Ǫgmundarson [ˈkorˌmɑːkz̠ ˈɔɣˌmundɑz̠ˌson]; Modern Icelandic: Kormákur Ögmundarson [ˈkʰɔrˌmauːkʏr ˈœɣˌmʏntarˌsɔːn]) was a 10th-century Icelandic skald. He is the protagonist of Kormáks saga which preserves a significant amount of poetry attributed to him. According to Skáldatal, he was also the court poet of Sigurðr Hlaðajarl and fragments of a drápa to the jarl are preserved in Skáldskaparmál.

The following stanzas represent some of Kormákr's love poetry. He tells of the first time he met Steingerðr, the love of his life. Read aloud with modern Icelandic pronunciation.

Brunnu beggja kinna	The bright lights of both	Brightly beamed the lights-of-
bjǫrt ljós á mik drósar,	her cheeks burned onto me	both-her-cheeks upon me—
oss hlœgir þat eigi,	from the fire-hall's felled wood;	e'er will I recall it—
eldhúss of við felldan;	no cause of mirth for me in that.	o'er the heaped-up wood-pile;
enn til ǫkkla svanna	By the threshold I gained a glance	and the instep saw I
ítrvaxins gatk líta,	at the ankles of this girl	of the shapely woman—
þrǫ́ muna oss of ævi	of glorious shape; yet while I live	no laughing matter, lo! my
eldask, hjá þreskeldi.	that longing will never leave me.	longing—by the threshold.
Brámáni skein brúna	The moon of her eyelash—that valkyrie	Brightly shone the beaming
brims und ljósum himni	adorned with linen, server of herb-surf—	brow-moons of the goodly
Hristar hǫrvi glæstrar	shone hawk-sharp upon me	lady linen-dight, how
haukfránn á mik lauka;	beneath her brows' bright sky;	like a hawk's, upon me;
en sá geisli sýslir	but that beam from the eyelid-moon	but that beam from forehead's-
síðan gullmens Fríðar	of the goddess of the golden torque	bright-hued-orbs, I fear me,
hvarmatungls ok hringa	will later bring trouble to me	of the Eir-of-gold doth
Hlínar óþurft mína.	and to the ring goddess herself.	ill spell for us later.
— Einar Ól. Sveinsson's edition	— Rory McTurk's translation	— Lee M. Hollander's adaptation
