= Kai-n-Tiku-Aba =

Kai-n-Tiku-Aba was a sacred tree in the mythology of the Polynesian state of Kiribati.

== Origins ==
This myth is from Kiribati, to explain why the I-Kiribati migrated to Kiribati from Samoa.

== Story ==
In Kiribati, mythology, the sacred tree was known as the "Tree of Many Branches." It grew from the spine of Na Atibu (the father of the gods), after he died. The spine was buried in Samoa, and the tree Kai-n-tiku-aba grew. This tree was significant to the people as they believed they descended from it.

However, a man named Koura-Abi intentionally chopped down the tree, causing significant disruption and violence among the people. They scattered and were left sorrowful. The tree was also believed to have marked the northern and southern solstices, with its right side being the north solstice (the au-meang) and its left side being the southern solstice (the au-maiaki).
