= Olifat =

Olifat (also known as Yelafath, Orofat, Iolofath or Wolphat) is a trickster god in Micronesian mythology.

== Myth ==
Olifat was the grandson of the god Anulap, the son of the god Lugeilan and the mortal woman Tarisso. Tarisso was the daughter of the octopus goddess Hit. When Lugeilan's wife Hamulul attempted to prevent his union with Tarisso, Hit danced so lewdly that the woman fainted and had to be carried back to the sky, thus permitting Olifat's conception.

Olifat was born from his mother's head. Immediately after his birth, he ran away, cleaning the blood from himself on the trunks of palm trees and biting off his own umbilical cord, refusing to be touched by human hands. Anulap warned Olifat's mother never to let him drink from a coconut with a small hole, for fear that the young god would discover his father's identity. Still, Olifat eventually found such a coconut and, tipping his head back to drain the milk, saw his father in the heavens.

Olifat was jealous of his siblings, believing them to be more attractive than him. Seeing two of his nephews playing with a shark, Olifat out of spite gave the shark sharp teeth with which to bite the boys' hands. His sister Lugoapup identified her brother as the culprit, with the result that the gods decided to recall Olifat to Heaven, given that he was causing too much trouble on Earth.

Travelling to Heaven to visit his father, Olifat caused chaos for the gods, overturning their pans, keeping them awake and seducing their daughters. Aware of their animosity, Olifat faked his own death by climbing into the foundations of a house the gods were building. When the other gods thrust a post into the hole he was in, Olifat hid in a specially dug alcove and threw up handfuls of chewed leaves and red mud. The gods, convinced that they had seen Olifat's viscera spurting out, assumed that he was dead and filled in the hole. Olifat then used the mid-rib of a palm leaf to burrow up through the wooden post and into the rafters of the building, where he banged a coconut shell and pretended to be an evil spirit. The other gods were afraid, but Anulap saw through his offspring's trick and ordered him down.

Many attempts were made to slay Olifat, but he escaped through trickery each time. For example, when the gods tried to drown him in a fishing basket, Olifat escaped to a nearby canoe in disguise, and then conned the other gods out of their catch of fish to boot. When they attempted to burn him, Olifat used a roll of coconut matting to protect himself from the flames and escape.

The other gods then attempted to kill Olifat by sending him to take food to the thunder, but handing over the meal and enraging the thunder with his impudence, Olifat hid himself in a reed and escaped unscathed. He was then sent to take food to the Fela, a predatory fish. The fish caught Olifat on a hook, and finally killed him. Olifat's father, however, found his son and resurrected him; he then beat the Fela with a club, and broke the fish's jaw.

Olifat is blamed for numerous problems in Micronesian life, including sour wine, bad eggs and termite infestations. He is also said to be responsible for the shark's teeth, the stingray's tail and the spines of the scorpionfish. He is, however, credited with the Promethean feat of bringing humanity the secret of fire, having employed a bird to bring an ember down from the sun. He is also the mythological originator of tattooing.
