= Lugeilan =

In Micronesian mythology, Lugeilan is the father of the god Olifat.
