= Æsir =

Gods in Germanic paganism

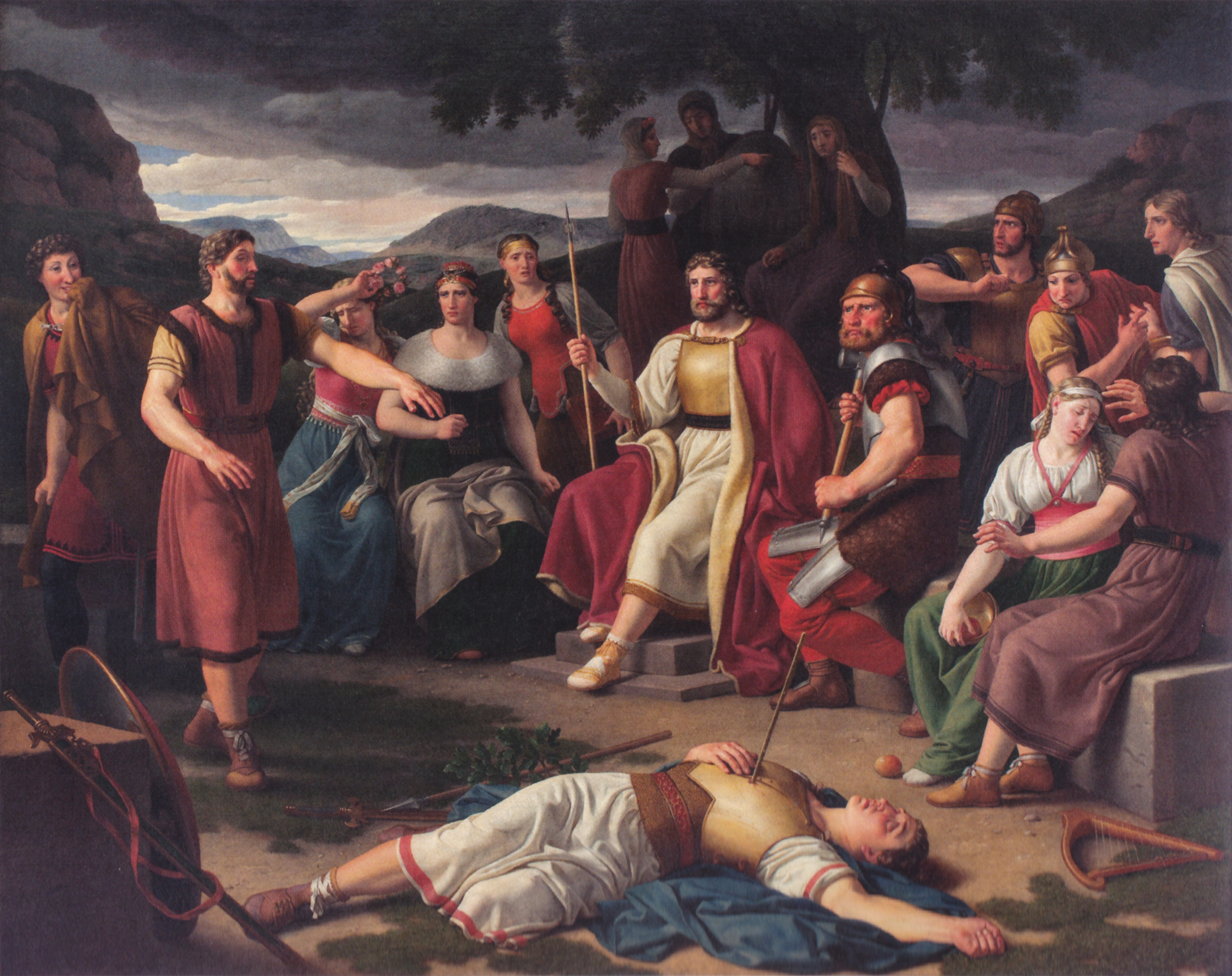
Æsir gathered around the body of Baldr. Painting by Christoffer Wilhelm Eckersberg, 1817

Æsir (Old Norse; singular: áss, female: ásynja, female plural: ásynjur) or ēse (Old English; singular: ōs) are gods in Germanic paganism. In Old Nordic religion and mythology, the precise meaning of the term Æsir is debated, as it can refer either to the gods in general or specifically to one of the main families of gods, in contrast to the Vanir, with whom the Æsir waged war, ultimately leading to a joining of the families. The term can further be applied to local gods that were believed to live in specific features in the landscape – such as fells. The Old English medical text Wið færstice refers to the Ēse, along with elves, as harmful beings that could cause a stabbing pain, although exactly how they were conceived of by the author of the text is unclear.

Áss and its cognate forms feature in many Germanic names, such as Oswald and Ásmundr, and in some place-names in Norway and Sweden. The Æsir further likely give their name to the A-rune, attested in the Elder Futhark, Anglo-Saxon Futhorc and Younger Futhark.

== Terminology ==
=== Etymology ===
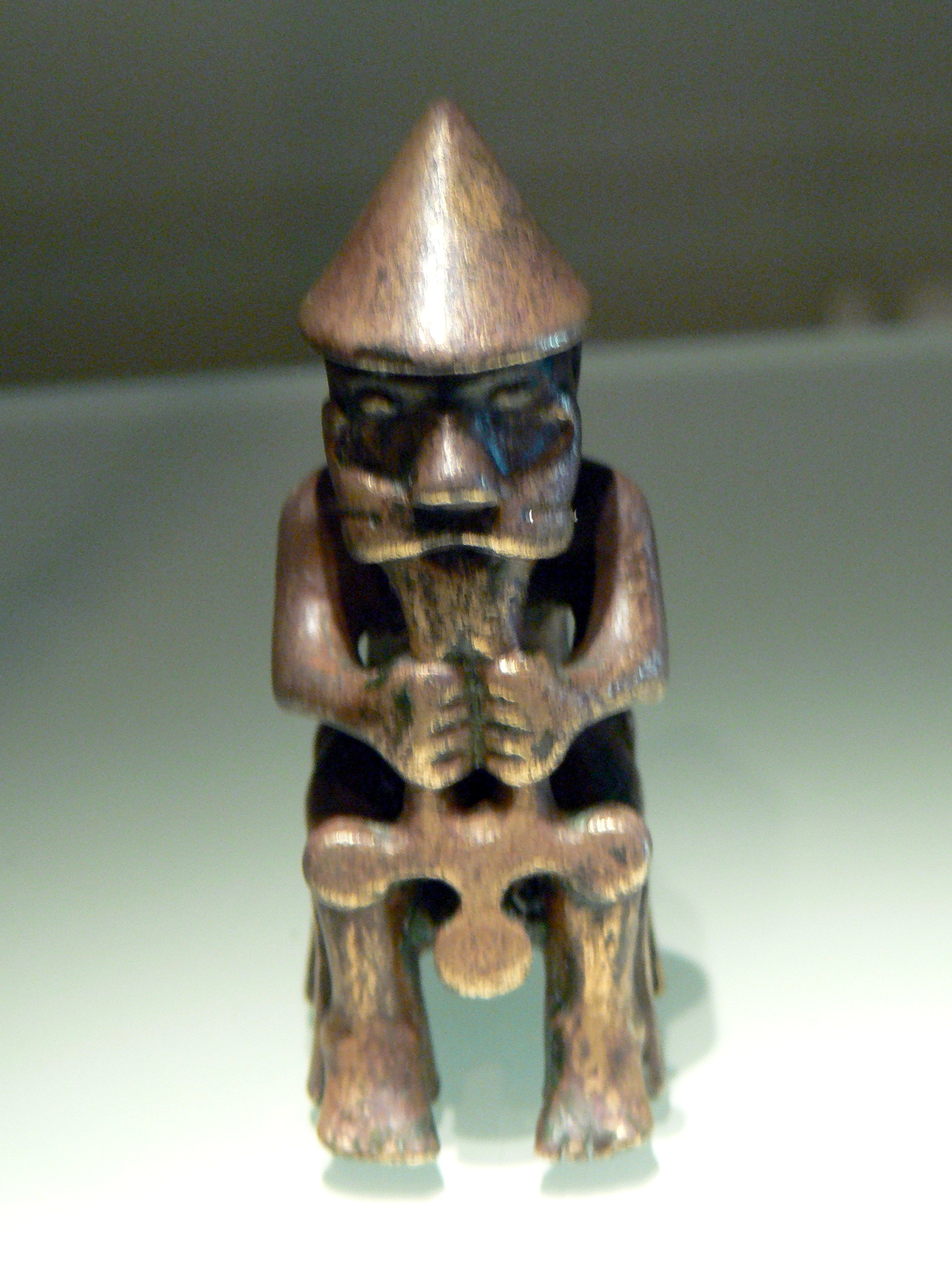
The Eyrarland Statue, typically interpreted as depicting Thor. Thor's riding across the sky is likely reflected in the modern Swedish word for "thunderstorm" – Swedish: åska, deriving from an earlier form meaning "the driving of the áss".

The modern English term "Æsir" is derived from the plural Old Norse term æsir, the singular of which is áss. In Old English, the term used is the cognate ōs (pl. ēse). In continental West Germanic languages, the word is only attested in personal and place names such as Ansila, Ansgeir and Anshram. The cognate term Ansis was recorded as a Latinised form of an original Gothic word by Jordanes, in the 6th century CE work Getica, as a name for euhemerised semi-divine early Gothic rulers. (Note: The reference in Getica is as follows: Latin: Tum Gothi haut segnes reperti arma capessunt primoque conflictu mox Romanos devincunt, Fuscoque duce extincto divitias de castris militum spoliant magnaque potiti per loca victoria iam proceres suos, quorum quasi fortuna vincebant, non puros homines, sed semideos id est Ansis vocaverunt. "But the Goths were on the alert. They took up arms and presently over-whelmed the Romans in the first encounter. They slew Fuscus, the commander, and plundered the soldiers’ camp of its treasure. And because of the great victory they had won in this region, they thereafter called their leaders, by whose good fortune they seemed to have conquered, not mere men, but demigods, that is Ansis.") The Old High German is reconstructed as *ans, plural *ensî.

The corresponding feminine form in Old Norse is ásynja (pl.:ásynjur), formed by the addition of the -ynja suffix, denoting a female form. A cognate word for "female áss" is not attested outside Old Norse, and a corresponding West Germanic word would have been separately derived with the feminine suffixes -inī or -injō.

The Proto-Germanic form is typically reconstructed as *ansuz. This form of the word is attested in Proto-Germanic during the Roman Imperial Age as a component of the name of the goddess *Vih-ansa (potentially translating to "Battle-goddess") and probably also in an inscription from around 200 CE on a buckle from Vimose that reads a(n)sau wīja ("I dedicate this to the Æsir"). The word *ansuz is in turn is typically derived from Proto-Indo-European *h₂ems-u-, making the terms closely related to Sanskrit: ásura, Avestan: ahura ("god" or "lord") and Hittite: ḫāši ("to give birth" or "to beget"). An alternative is that the terms for "Æsir" are related to *ans- ("beam" or "post"), the ancestor of Old Norse: áss ("the main beam of a house"). In this case, the name would likely have originated due to the equation of gods and carved posts in Germanic religion.

Snorri Sturluson and Saxo Grammaticus proposed that the term "Æsir" instead derives from "Ásiamenn ("Asians"), and the idea that the gods originated in Asia, later migrating into Northern Europe. This is however not supported by modern scholars and attributed to medieval scholarship on the matter and an attempt to connect the Scandinavian peoples with Classical antiquity and Christianity rather than a reflection of actual Germanic mythology.

=== Derived terms ===
Áss is further found in Old Norse compound nouns such as Asbrú ("Æsir's bridge"), Ásgarð ("home" or "enclosure of the Æsir"), ásmegin ("strength of the Æsir") and the names for Thor Asa-Þórr ("Æsir-Thor") and Asabragr ("Æsir-lord"). The only modern word that is derived from terms for æsir, other than learned borrowings from medieval languages is Swedish: åska, meaning "thunderstorm", which is derived from earlier åsekja ("the driving of the áss"), which would derive from the reconstructed Old East Norse:*ās-ækia. This is likely in reference to the belief in thunderstorms originating from Thor's riding across the skies.

Terms for Æsir form parts of Germanic names in multiple Germanic languages. Examples of this include Old English: Ósbeorn, Óslác, Ósweald (Modern English: Oswald) and their corresponding Old Norse equivalents, Ásbjörn, Áslákr and Ásvaldr. Other examples include Old English: Óswine and Old Norse: Ásmundr. Some Proto-Norse personal names feature *ansuz such as Ansugastiz, Ansugīslaz and *Ansulaibaz. (Note: Ansugastiz and Ansugīslaz are found in runic inscriptions, while *Ansulaibaz is reconstructed from the corresponding Old English name in Beowulf.)

== Old Norse sources ==
=== Meaning of the term "Æsir" ===
==== Distinctions between "áss", "goð" and "vanr" ====
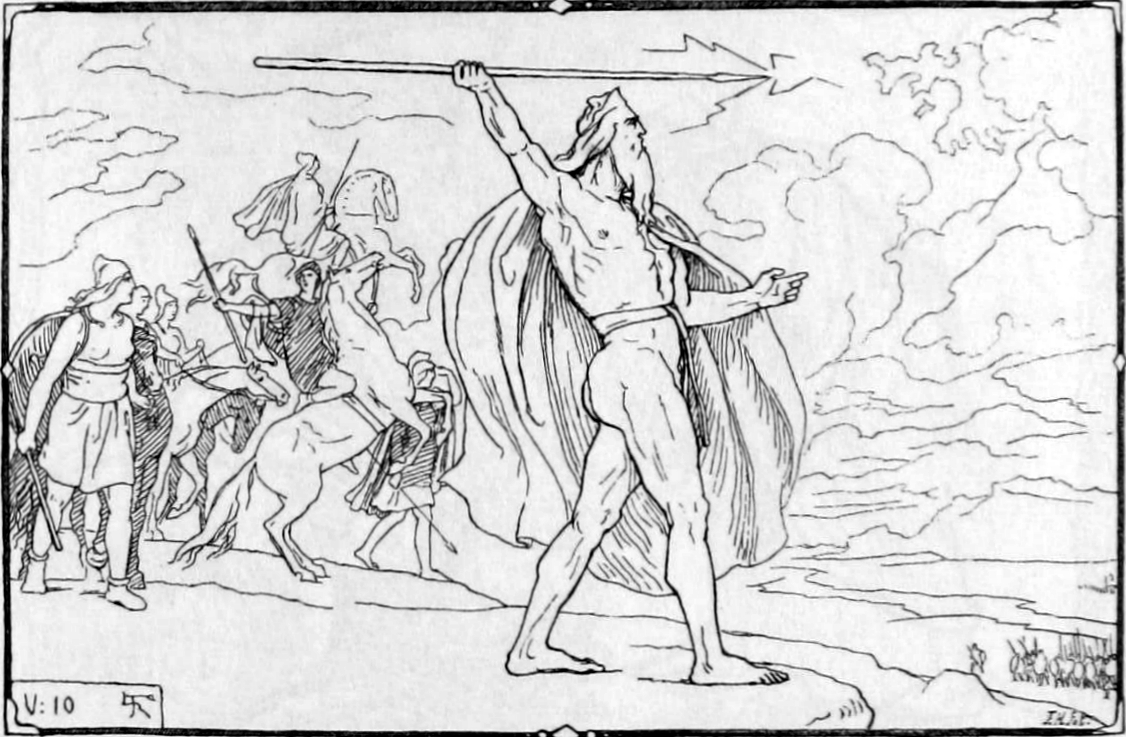
Óðinn throws his spear in the Æsir-Vanir war, illustration by Lorenz Frølich (1895)

It has been proposed that in Old Norse poetry, the term "áss" was typically chosen over "goð" for metrical reasons, fitting better with the required alliteration or rhyme, rather than so as to create a semantic distinction between the two terms. Following from this, it has been argued that the term "æsir" acts as a synonym to "goð" and is inclusive of Njörðr and his descendants, typically referred to as the Vanir. Examples of this are seen in the þulur, where Njöðr and Freyr are listed in the ása heiti ("Poetic equivalents for áss") and Freyja in that for the ásunjur.

The main tales that present the Æsir and Vanir as distinct family groups are those concerning the Æsir-Vanir war, which are contained within Völuspá, Ynglinga saga and Skáldskaparmál. This conflict between the gods occurred long in the past and in Ynglinga saga ends with the exchange of Hœnir and Mímir as hostages from the Æsir with Njörðr, Freyr and Kvasir from the Vanir. Skáldskaparmal alternatively says that at the end of the war, the two groups mixed their spit in a vat and created Kvasir from it. The inclusion of gods typically referred to as Vanir as Æsir is that the Vanir may have been seen as fully integrated into the Æsir after the resolution of this war between the two groups.

==== Proposed origins of a distinction with Vanir ====
Despite the inclusion of at least some of the Vanir within the Æsir, some scholars have argued that some differences between the two groups remain, such as the Vanir appearing to have mainly been connected with cultivation and fertility and the Æsir with power and war. Conversely, it has been argued that this division of domains is not reflected in the sources, with the Vanir being instead more associated with kingship and the Æsir with creation.

One idea is that the Vanir (and the fertility cult associated with them) may be more archaic than that of the more warlike Æsir, such that the mythical war may mirror a half-remembered religious conflict. This argument was first suggested in Wilhelm Mannhardt's Antike Vald-und Feldkulten.

On a similar note, Marija Gimbutas argues that the Æsir and the Vanir represent the displacement of an indigenous group by a tribe of warlike Indo-European invaders as part of her Kurgan hypothesis. Another historical theory is that the inter-pantheon interaction may be an apotheosisation of the conflict between the Roman Kingdom and the Sabines. Given the difference between their roles and emphases, some scholars have speculated that the interactions between the Æsir and the Vanir reflect the types of interaction that were occurring between social classes (or clans) within Norse society at the time.

Finally, the noted comparative religion scholar Mircea Eliade speculated that this conflict is actually a later version of an Indo-European myth concerning the conflict between and eventual integration of a pantheon of sky/warrior/ruler gods and a pantheon of earth/economics/fertility gods, with no strict historical antecedents. (Note: "In one civilization, and at one time, the specialized gods of fertility might predominate, and in another the warrior or the god-king. The highest god owes his position to those who worship him, and if they are farmers, he will be a god of fertility, or one of the Vanir".)

==== Specific beings referred to as Æsir ====
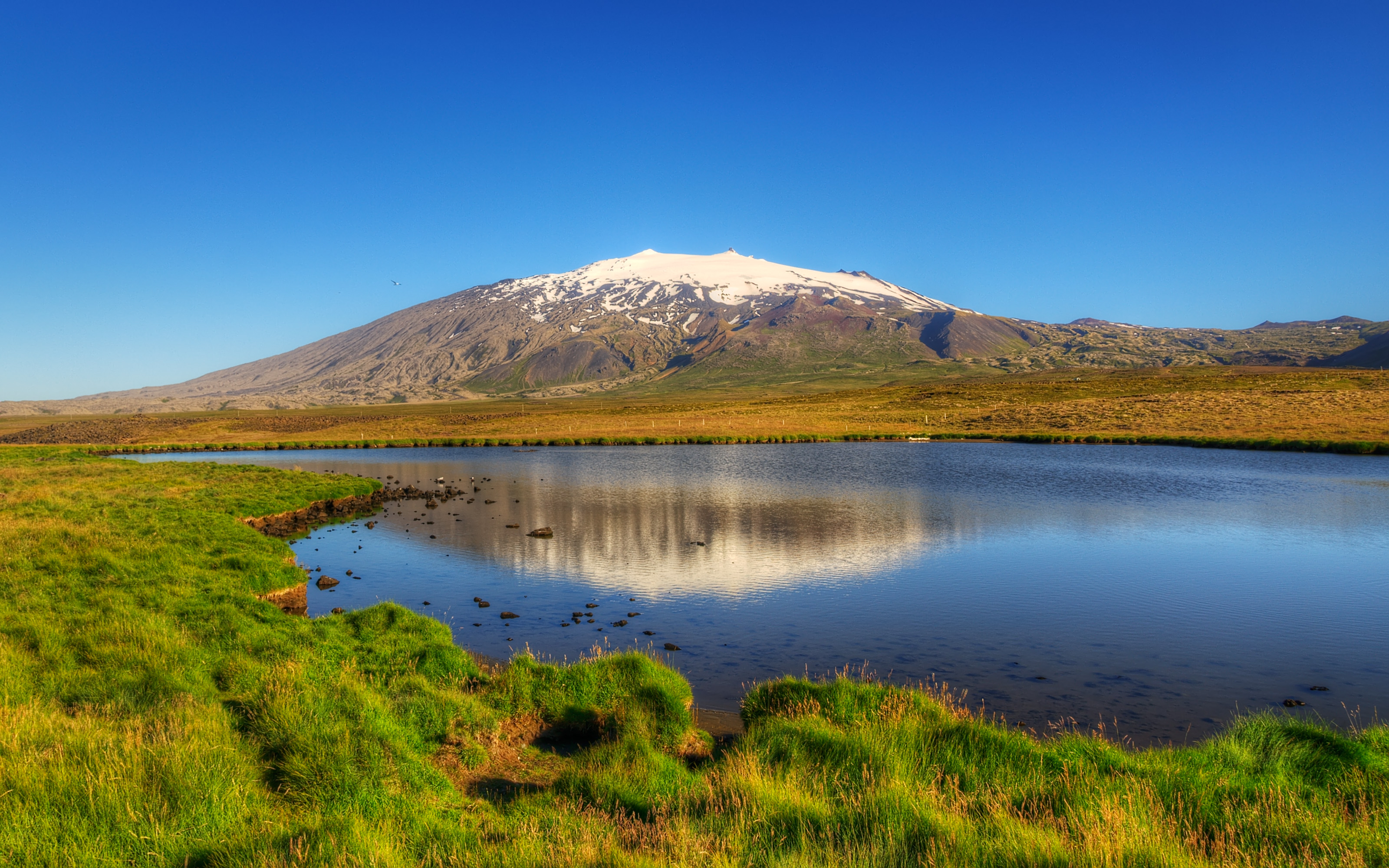
Snæfell in Iceland, where according to Barðar saga, Barðr Snæfellsáss became an áss who was worshipped in the region and protected those who lived there.

Snorri Sturluson's Prose Edda contains two lists of Æsir, one in Gylfaginning and one in the þulur. Though these sources largely agree, they are not identical. Gylfaginning lists the male Æsir as Odin, (Note: Odin is referred to in the þulur as Yggr.) Thor, Njörðr, (Note: In Gylfaginning, Njörðr is listed as the third áss yet is also noted to be "not of the race of the Æsir" (Old Norse: Eigi er Njörðr ása ættar.) Freyr, (Note: Freyr is referred to in the þulur as Yngvi-Freyr.) Týr, Heimdallr, Bragi, Víðarr, Váli, Ullr, Forseti and Loki and the ásynjur as Frigg, Sága, Eir, Gefjon, Fulla, Freyja, Sjöfn, Lofn, Vár, Vör, Syn, Hlín, Snotra, Gná, Sól, Bil The þulur add to this the ásynjur Skaði, Sigyn, Hnoss, Gerðr, Jörð, Iðunn, Ilmr, Njörun, Nanna, Rindr, Þrúðr, Rán. Some scholars have noted, however, that the Prose Edda does not reflect a worldview held by all heathen Nordic, or more widely Germanic, people throughout time and space. Terry Gunnell further challenges the idea that all North-Germanic people conceived of the gods as Snorri portrays them – living as a pantheon of Æsir and Vanir in Ásgarð together and all being ruled by Óðinn who is the ancestor of many of them. He proposes that this view of Óðinn as the leader of a distinct family of gods, the Æsir, would likely not have been held by the majority of heathens, instead resulting from the material that Snorri presents coming from the elite warrior class, with whom Óðinn was closely associated.

Beyond this, a runic inscription on the 9th century CE Engstad whalebone pin has been interpreted as referencing an Old Norse: garðáss ("yard-áss" or "áss of the settled space"). In this context, it has been proposed that the term would refer to a local god or being of that specific farmstead rather than of the whole world more generally. (Note: The normalised spelling is Old Norse: garðáss, being derived from the inscription which reads karþạs with k and a as a bind rune. The bind rune could theoretically be read in the other order as ak, making the inscription akrþạs.) Similarly, the Old Norse term landáss ("land-áss") is used in a poem attributed to Egill Skallagrímsson to refer to one of a list of gods which he wishes to turn against King Eiríkr. This god is often interpreted as being Thor, though it is also possible that it refers to a local land spirit, possibly the landálfr ("land-elf") referred to in the next stanza of the poem. Æsir closely associated with specific fells or hills are also found in the Old Norse record such as Svínfellsáss ("the áss of Svínfell"), referred in an insult in Njáls saga, and Barðr Snæfellsáss ("áss of Snæfell"), a man who got his name, according to his eponymous saga, because he of the worship he received by those living around Snæfell and the help he in turn gave them when they were in need. (Note: "kallaðr Bárðr Snjófelsáss, þvíat þeir trúðu á hann náliga þar um nesit, ok höfðu hann fyrir heitguð sinn, varð hann ok mörgum en mesta bjargvættr". was called Bard Snowfelsás, because they believed in him near about the headland, and had him through his namesake, and he became many but the greatest saviour.)

In the context of ritual speech, an unnamed áss is the almáttki áss ("almighty áss") mentioned along with Frey and Njörð in a formula said by individuals swearing an oath on a ring. This has been variously identified by scholars as Thor, Ullr and Odin, although the possibility remains that it is a result of Christian work that was written as a foreshadowing of the establishment of Christianity, as an example of the "noble pagan" motif.

The term áss is further used in translations of works into Old Norse such as in Díalógar Gregors páfa, in which the phrase sólar áss ("áss of the sun") is used to refer to Apollo, in the phrase sævar goð ("god of the sea") and in drauma goð ("god of dreams"). Morkinskinna further describes copper images of æsir, Völsungs and Gjúkings at the hippodrome in Constantinople. This has been interpreted as translating Greek gods and heroes into a Germanic context, however, other proposals include that this should be seen as stemming from a euhemeristic angle, with the Æsir being descended from Trojans, as they are depicted by Snorri in the Prose Edda and Ynglinga Saga.

=== Relation with jötnar ===
It has been proposed that most narratives in Old Nordic mythology portray existence as broadly divided into "this world", inhabited by the Æsir and men, and "the otherworld" inhabited by beings such as jötnar. These narratives often centre on the journey of an áss to the otherworld, either to obtain something important from there, or to resolve an issue that has arisen in Ásgarð through social exchange with the otherworld. The jötnar also are presented as a constant threat to the Æsir, leading them into confrontation with Thor who stops the jötnar overrunning Ásgarð and Miðgarð.

Despite this general juxtaposition between the Æsir and the jötnar, they were not conceived of as necessarily "biologically" distinct from one another, with many of the Æsir being descended from jötnar such as Odin, Thor, and Loki. Many Æsir also marry and have children with gýgjar (jötunn women) such as Odin, who marries Jörð and fathers Thor with her, and Freyr who weds Gerð, founding the Yngling family. In descriptions of weddings celebrated by the Æsir, the gýgjar spouses appear to be fully integrated into the Æsir.

Furthermore, the Æsir are depicted as having strong positive relations with some jötnar such as Ægir, who hosts them for a feast where they all drink together in the poem Lokasenna. Other jötnar are seen by the Æsir as sources of knowledge, such as Vafþrúðnir, with whom Odin has a wisdom contest in Vafþrúðnismál, and Hyndla to whom Freyja travels in the poem Hyndluljóð to find out the lineage of Ottar.

== Old English sources ==
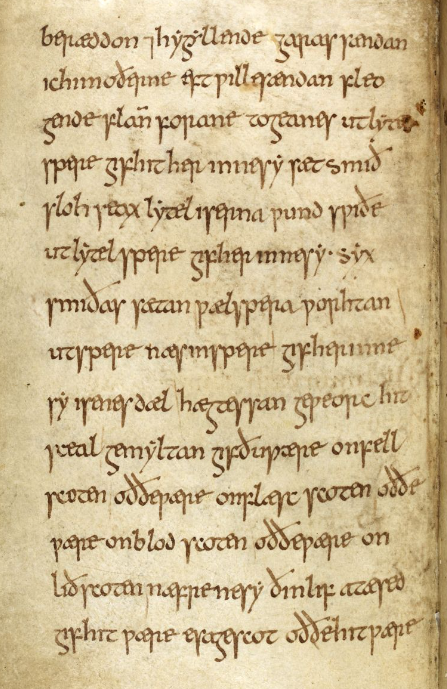
The word "ēsa", as written on the bottom line of a page recording Wið færstice from the Lācnunga, Harleian collection, British Library

=== Wið færstice ===
The Wið færstice text from the late 10th or early 11th century Lācnunga is an Old English remedy against harm caused by several beings including ēse and ælfe (often translated as "elves").

gif hit wǣre ēsa gescot oððe hit wǣre ylfa gescot
oððe hit wǣre hægtessan gescot nū ic wille ðīn helpan
þis ðē tō bōte ēsa gescotes ðis ðē tō bōte ylfa gescotes
ðis ðē tō bōte hægtessan gescotes ic ðīn wille helpan
flēo [?MS fled] þǣr on fyrgenhǣfde
hāl westū helpe ðīn drihten
nim þonne þæt seax ādō on wǣtan·

— Old English text
Translation:

If it was the gescot of ēse or it was the gescot of ælfe
or it was the gescot of hægtessan, now I want to (?will) help you.
This for you as a remedy for the gescot of ēse; this for you
as a remedy for the gescot of ælfe,
this for you as a remedy for the gescot of hægtessan; I will help you.
Fly around there on the mountain top. Be healthy, may the Lord help you.
Then take the knife; put it in (the) liquid.

— Hall Translation

The collocation of ēse and elves Wið færstice is paralleled in Old Norse writings as the alliterative phrase "æsir and álfar". (Note: Examples of this formula include Mart var þar ása oc álfa ("Many of the æsir and álfar were there") from the prose prologue to Lokasenna and ása oc álfa, er hér inno ero "of the æsir and álfar who are here within") from the body of the poem.) It is not clear whether this formula dates back to the ancestral community speaking the ancestor of Old Norse and Old English and thus had always existed in both languages, or was the result of a later loaning due to the close cultural contact.

It has been proposed that just like in early Old Norse-speaking communities, those speaking Old English early on would also have placed ēse and ælfe in contrast with monstrous beings such as eotenas and wyrmas, although it is unclear exactly how the beings were conceived of in English-speaking communities by the time that Wið færstice was written.

== The A-rune (ᚫ, ᚩ or ᚬ) ==
The Proto-Germanic name of the A rune, written in Elder Futhark as ᚫ and Anglo-Saxon Futhorc as ᚩ, is typically reconstructed as Proto-Germanic: *ansuz, an áss (or heathen god). This identification is principally based on the Icelandic rune poem which reads as records the name of the Younger Futhark form of the rune, ᚬ, as Ós, referring to Odin:

Standardised Old Norse text (Note: The rune poem is preserved in two manuscripts from the Arnamagnæan Manuscript Collection, AM 687d 4to and AM 461 12mo. The column titled standardised Old Norse is based on those two attestations.)	Modern English translation
ᚬ Óss er algingautr ok ásgarðs jöfurr, ok valhallar vísi.	Heathen god/Óðinn is ancient Gautur and Ásgarðr’s prince and Valhall’s ruler.

Some scholars have translated the name of the rune in the Old English rune poem as ōs ("god"), with the word commonly accepted as being a cognate of áss, however others interpret it as meaning "mouth" that would have come to Old English from Proto-Germanic or result from influence from either Old Norse: óss ("river mouth") or Latin: os ("mouth"). The Old Swedish and Old Norwegian rune poems both refer to the name as meaning "river mouth" rather than "god".

== Modern worship ==
Ásatrú, meaning "faith in the Æsir", is a new religious movement also known as Heathenry that aims to reconstruct and practise a modern form of Germanic paganism. As of 2007, Ásatrú is a religion officially recognized by the governments of Denmark, Iceland, Norway, and Sweden. In the United Kingdom, the organisation Asatru UK is registered as a community interest company for religious activities.

Most adherents do not emphasise worship of the Æsir in particular and may also refer to their practice as "forn sed / sidr / siður" meaning old customs. The Icelandic Ásatrúarfélagið describes Ásatrú as "Nordic pantheism" involving "belief in the Icelandic/Nordic folklore" including all the "spirits and entities" besides "gods and other beings" this entails. (Note: Ásatrú eða heiðinn siður byggir á umburðarlyndi, heiðarleika, drengskap og virðingu fyrir náttúrunni og öllu lífi. Ásatrú is a pagan tradition based on tolerance, honesty, magnanimity and respect for nature and all life.)

== Place-names ==
Place-names containing the word áss or cognate terms have been proposed for the following:

Sweden:

- Aspberg
- Åslunda

Norway

- Ásaráll

No such locations have yet been found in England that are widely accepted by scholars.

== See also ==
- Proto-Germanic paganism
- Family trees of the Norse gods
- Horses of the Æsir
- Tuatha Dé Danann
- Twelve Olympians
- Anunnaki

== Bibliography ==
=== Primary ===
- Vigfússon, Guðbrandur (1860). Bárðarsaga Snæfellsáss, Viglundarsaga (in Icelandic). Berlingske bogtrykkeri ved N. H. Stenderup.
- McKinnell, John; Simek, Rudolf; Düwel, Klaus (2004). "Gods and Mythological Beings in the Younger Futhark" (PDF). Runes, magic and religion: a sourcebook. Fassbaender.
- Mierow, Charles Christopher (1915). The Gothic history of Jordanes in English version;. Princeton, Univ. Press.
- "Iordanis de Origine Actibusque Getarum, chapter 13". www.thelatinlibrary.com (in Latin).
- Rune poems. Translated by Dickins, Bruce. 1915.

=== Secondary ===
- Asprem, Egil (3 October 2008). "Heathens up North:Politics, Polemics and Contemporary Norse Paganism in Norway". Pomegranate. 10 (1): 49. doi:10.1558/pome.v10i1.41. ISSN 1743-1735.
- Dumézil, Georges (1973). Gods of the ancient northmen. Berkeley, Calif.: Univ. of California Pr. ISBN 0520020448.
- Eliade, Mircea (1996). Patterns in comparative religion. Lincoln: University of Nebraska Press. ISBN 9780803267336.
- Frog (2021). "The Æsir: An Obituary" (PDF). Essays in Honour of Rudolf Simek.
- Gimbutas, M.; Dexter, M.R. (2001). The Living Goddesses. University of California Press. ISBN 978-0-520-22915-0.
- Grimm, Jacob; Stallybrass, James Steven (1882–1888). Teutonic mythology. London: G. Bell and sons.
- Gunnell, Terry (2015). "Pantheon? What Pantheon? Concepts of a Family of Gods in Pre-Christian Scandinavian Religions". Scripta Islandica: Isländska sällskapets årsbok. 66. Isländska sällskapet: 55–76.
- Hall, A. (2006). "Are there any Elves in Anglo-Saxon place-names?". Nomina: Journal of the Society for Name Studies in Britain and Ireland. 29: 61–80. ISSN 0141-6340.
- Hall, Alaric (2007). Elves in Anglo-Saxon England: matters of belief, health, gender and identity. Woodbridge, Suffolk, UK: Boydell Press. ISBN 978-1843835097.
- Hellquist, Elof (1922). Svensk etymologisk ordbok [Swedish etymological dictionary] (in Swedish). Lund: Gleerup. p. 1202.
- Jakobsson, Ármann (1998). ""History of the Trolls? Bárðar saga as an historical narrative," Saga-Book 25 (1998), 53–71". Saga-Book of the Viking Society.
- Kroonen, Guus (2013). Etymological Dictionary of Proto-Germanic.
- Lindow, John (2002). Norse mythology: a guide to the Gods, heroes, rituals, and beliefs. Oxford: Oxford University Press. ISBN 9786610532490. OCLC 1136323846.
- Lummer, Felix (2021). "Solitary Colossi and Not-So-Small Men". Arv – Nordic Yearbook of Folklore. 77 (1): 57–85.
- McKinnell, John (2005). Meeting the other in Norse myth and legend. Woodbridge, Suffolk, UK: D.S. Brewer. ISBN 1843840421.
- Motz, Lotte (1984). "Trolls and Æsir; lexical evidence concerning north-germanic faith". Indogermanische Forschungen. 89: 179–195. doi:10.1515/9783110243314.179. S2CID 201714920.
- Nordvig, Mathias (2013). "A Method for Analyzing World-Models in Scandinavian Mythology". Aarhus University. Annales Academiae Scientiarum Fennicae. Series Humaniora: 377–398. ISBN 978-951-41-1085-6.
- Silva, Inmaculada Senra (1 January 2006). "A note on the meaning of os in the Old English Rune Poem". Epos: Revista de filología (22): 393. doi:10.5944/epos.22.2006.10523. ISSN 2255-3495.
- Simek, Rudolf (2008). A Dictionary of Northern Mythology. Translated by Hall, Angela. BOYE6. ISBN 9780859915137.
- Turville-Petre, Edward Oswald Gabriel (1975). Myth and religion of the north: the religion of ancient Scandinavia (Repr ed.). Westport, Conn: Greenwood Press. ISBN 0837174201.
- Vikstrand, Per (2009). "Pre-Christian Sacral Personal Names in Scandinavia during the Proto-Scandinavian Period" (PDF). Proceedings of the 23rd International Congress of Onomastic Sciences. York University.
- Tichy, Ondrej. "ós". Bosworth-Toller's Anglo-Saxon Dictionary online.
- "Old Icelandic Dictionary - Áss". Old Icelandic Dictionary.
- "Old Norse Dictionary - Ás-ynja". Cleasby & Vigfusson - Old Norse Dictionary.
- "Gylfaginning 11-20". www.voluspa.org.
- "Gylfaginning 21-30". www.voluspa.org.
- "Gylfaginning 31-40". www.voluspa.org.
- "Nafnaþulur". www.voluspa.org.
- "Kirkeministeriet" (in Danish). Archived from the original on 9 February 2007. "Forn Sidr – Asa– og Vanetrosamfundet i Danmark"
- "Listi yfir skráð trúfélög og lífsskoðunarfélög" (in Icelandic). Sýslumenn. Archived from the original on 8 May 2021. "Ásatrúarfélagið"
- "Freja, Oden och Tor får officiell status". sydsvenskan (in Swedish). 11 August 2011. Archived from the original on 11 August 2011.
- "ASATRU UK CIC overview - GOV.UK". find-and-update.company-information.service.gov.uk.
- "Asatru.is". asatru.is (in Icelandic). Archived from the original on 5 December 2006.
- "Reconstruction:Proto-Germanic/Ansuwaldaz". Wiktionary, the free dictionary. 13 July 2022.
