= Anulap =

Sky god in mythology of Truk (Micronesia)

Anulap is a sky god in the mythology of the island of Truk in Micronesia.

He is the husband of the creator goddess Ligobubfanu. Their son was Lugeilan, and their grandson was Olifat.
