= Jenny Wilhelms =

Finnish musician (born 1974)

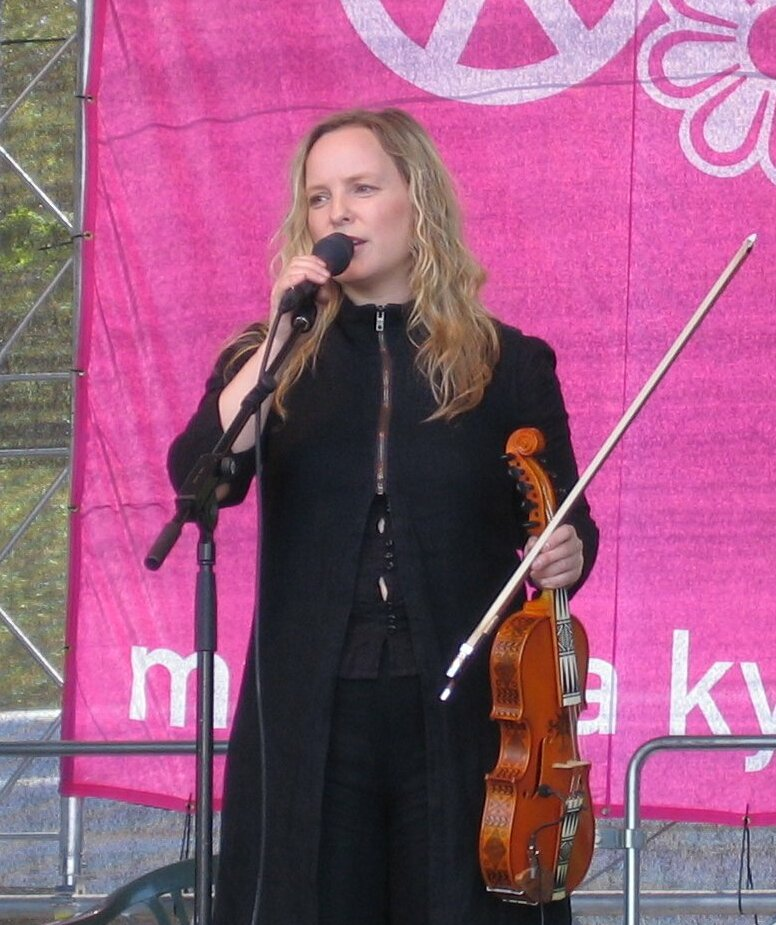
Jenny Wilhelms

Jenny Wilhelms (born 1974) is a Finnish musician. She studied classical and folk music in many Nordic countries. She has been the lead singer of the innovative folk rock band Gjallarhorn from 1994. Later, according to her bio for her appearance at the 2011 Tampere vocal music festival, she "specialises in vocal physiology for non-classical singers and teaches privately, gives masterclasses and works with choirs and ensembles".

Wilhelms is focused on the vocal and fiddling tradition in Scandinavia and has studied various Nordic folk music styles.

Wilhelms studied at the Malungs Folkhögskola (Dalarna, Sweden), the Mellersta Österbottens Konservatorium, (Karleby, Finland), The Sibelius Academy, (Helsinki, Finland), The Grieg Academy (Bergen, Norway), the World Academy of Music and Dance, Ireland, and the Conservatory of Keski-Pohjanmaa, Finland.

Wilhelms has arranged and composed folk music for choirs and vocal ensembles. Her four pieces, ordered for the 55th anniversary of the Flora Female Choir at the Åbo Akademi University, won the first prize in a Scandinavian Choir arranging competition in 1999.

Wilhelms has studied and taught the medieval ballads of Scandinavia, Finnish runo-chanting, Icelandic rímur chanting and Cow calling (kulning) from Sweden and Norway. All these elements can be found in Gjallarhorn's music.

== Sources ==
- www.gjallarhorn.com/jenny
- Tampere Vocal Music Festival 2011
