= Gjallarhorn =

Horn in Norse mythology

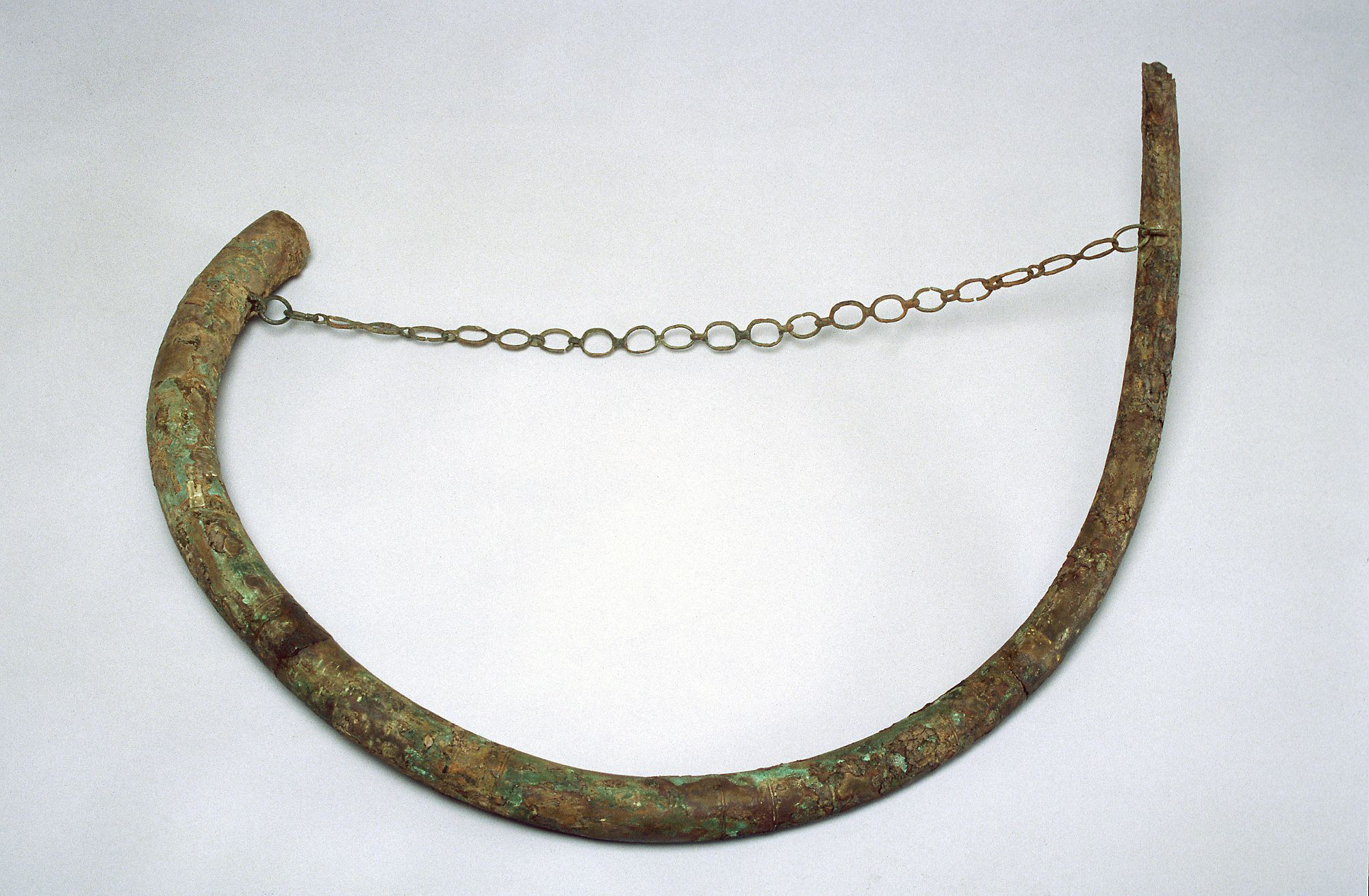
Bronze horn from 899-700 B.C. Påarp, Sweden.

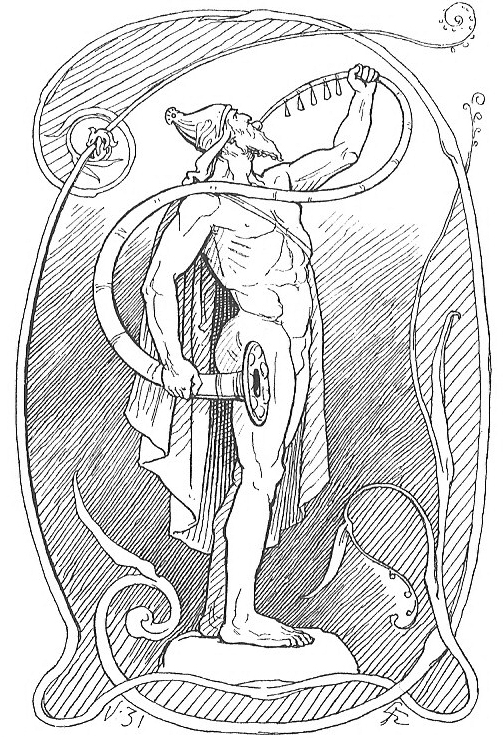
Heimdallr blows into Gjallarhorn in an 1895 illustration by Lorenz Frølich

In Norse mythology, Gjallarhorn (Old Norse: [ˈɡjɑlːɑrˌhorn]; "hollering horn" or "the loud sounding horn") is a horn associated with the god Heimdallr and the wise being Mímir. The sound of Heimdallr's horn will herald the beginning of Ragnarök, the sound of which will be heard in all corners of the world. Gjallarhorn is attested in the Poetic Edda, compiled in the 13th century from earlier traditional material, and the Prose Edda, written in the 13th century by Snorri Sturluson.

== Attestations ==
Gjallarhorn is attested once by name in the Poetic Edda while it receives three mentions in the Prose Edda:

=== Prose Edda ===
In the Prose Edda, Gjallarhorn is mentioned three times, all mentions occurring in Gylfaginning.

In chapter 15, the enthroned figure Just-As-High tells the disguised Gangleri about the cosmological tree Yggdrasil. Just-As-High says that one of the three roots of Yggdrasil reaches to the well Mímisbrunnr, which belongs to Mímir, and contains much wisdom and intelligence. Using Gjallarhorn, Heimdallr drinks from the well and thus is himself wise.

In chapter 27 of Gylfaginning, High tells Gangleri about Heimdallr. High mentions that Heimdallr is the owner of the "trumpet" (see footnote) Gjallarhorn and that "its blast can be heard in all worlds".

In chapter 51, High foretells the events of Ragnarök. After the enemies of the gods will gather at the plain Vígríðr, Heimdallr will stand and mightily blow into Gjallarhorn. The gods will awake and assemble together at the thing.

== Archaeological record ==
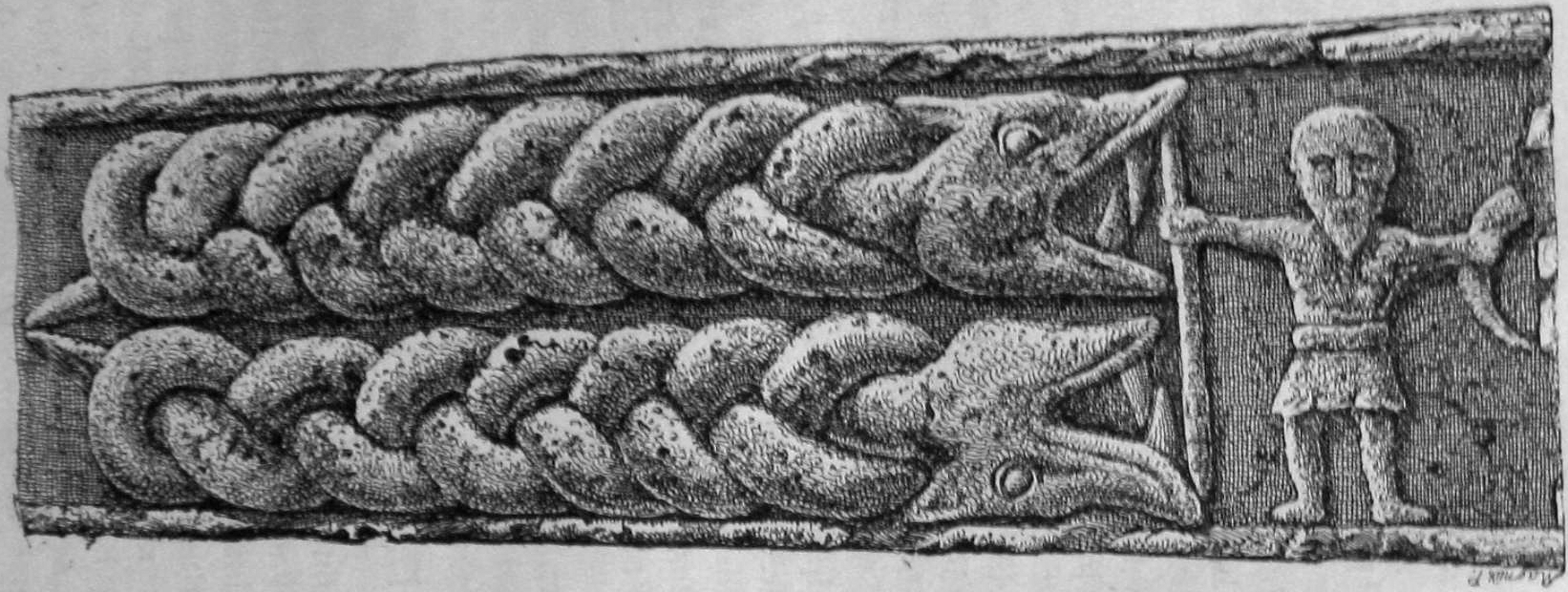
The Gosforth Cross panel often held to depict Heimdallr with Gjallarhorn

A figure holding a large horn to his lips and clasping a sword on his hip appears on a stone cross from the Isle of Man. Some scholars have theorized that this figure is a depiction of Heimdallr with Gjallarhorn.

A 9th or 10th century Gosforth Cross in Cumbria, England depicts a figure holding a horn and a sword standing defiantly before two open-mouthed beasts. This figure has been oft theorized as depicting Heimdallr with Gjallarhorn.

== Theories and interpretations ==
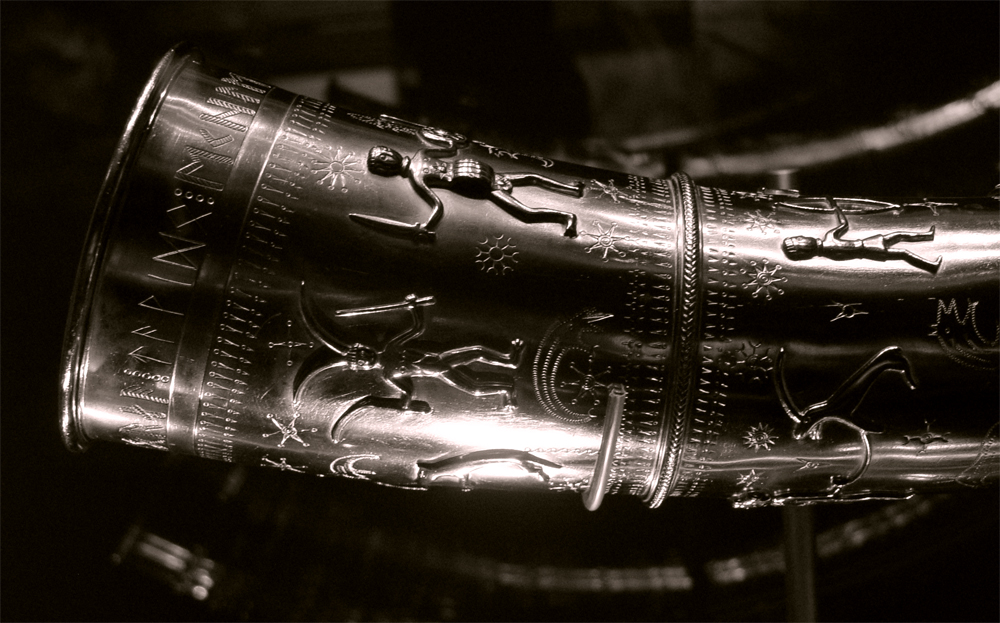
Detail of a copy of one of the two Golden Horns of Gallehus

Scholar Rudolf Simek comments that the use of a horn as both a musical instrument and a drinking vessel is not particularly odd, and that the concept is also employed with tales of the legendary Old French hero Roland's horn, Olifant. Simek notes that the horn is among the most ancient of Germanic musical instruments, along with lurs, and, citing archaeological finds (such as the 5th century Golden Horns of Gallehus from Denmark), comments that there appears to have been sacral horns kept purely for religious purposes among the Germanic people; understood as earthly versions of Heimdallr's Gjallarhorn, reaching back to the early Germanic Iron Age.

== See also ==
- The Snoldelev Stone, a 9th-century runestone featuring a unique three-horned symbol.
- Israfil, the angel who will blow the trumpet to signal the Day of Judgment in Islam.
- The Minnesota Vikings, an NFL American football team based in Minneapolis, use a large horn called the Gjallarhorn during home games at the U.S. Bank Stadium. It is blown during the opening ceremony alongside the Skol, Vikings fight song.
- Gjallarhorn — A powerful military and political organization in Mobile Suit Gundam: Iron-Blooded Orphans, responsible for maintaining order across Earth and the colonies following the Calamity War. Known for its elite Mobile Suits, strict hierarchy, and role as both peacekeeper and oppressor.
