= High, Just-as-High, and Third =

Mysterious characters from the Prose Edda

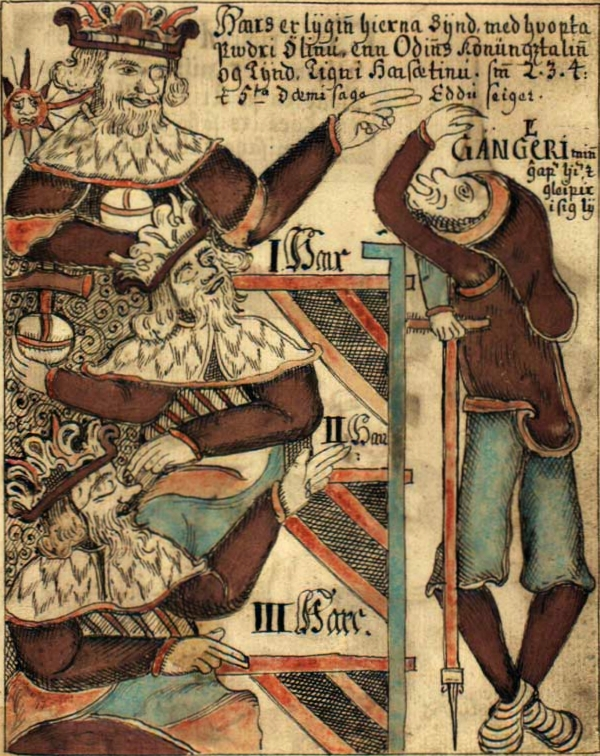
High, Just-As-High, and Third converse with Gangleri. Art from an 18th-century Icelandic manuscript.

Hár [ˈhɑːrː], Jafnhár [ˈjɑvnˌhɑːrː], and Þriði [ˈθriðe] (anglicized as Thridi) (Note: Finnur Jónsson's 1907 edition and Guðni Jónsson's 1935 transcription use Hárr and Jafnhárr (with two Rs). Anthony Faulkes's 1982 edition uses Hár and Jafnhár The Codex Wormianus manuscript spells the name Háár; the Codex Regius manuscript spells it Har, but often abbreviates it to just H. See Etymology of Hár and Hárr section; 'high' would be Hár while 'hoary' is Hárr.) are three men on thrones who appear in the Prose Edda in the Gylfaginning ('The Beguiling of Gylfi'), one of the oldest and most important sources on Norse mythology. Their names translate as High, Just-as-High, and Third in Old Norse, respectively. In the story, King Gylfi, calling himself Gangleri, engages in a test of wisdom with the three, asking them detailed questions about the Æsir, their deeds, and their future. The three respond until the final segment, in which the three men and the great hall suddenly disappear.

While the Gylfaginning never says so directly, some scholars believe the intent is that all three are manifestations of Odin, and thus would be able to answer Gangleri's questions in such detail, including ones on the eventual fate of the Æsir.

== Depiction in the Gylfaginning ==
In the Gylfaginning, King Gylfi is travelling to Asgard, but the Æsir realize he is coming and prepare illusions (sjónhverfing) for him. Gylfi finds a great hall and inquires as to its owner; he is told that the king owns the hall, and is offered a chance to meet him. Upon entering the throne room, he finds the three men:

He saw three thrones, each one higher than the other. Three men sat there, one in each seat. He asked the name of their ruler. The man guiding him replied that the king was in the lowest of the high seats; he was called High. Next came the one called Just-as-High, while the one highest up is called Third.

— Jesse Byock translation, Gylfaginning, Chapter 2

The rest of the Gylfaginning then proceeds as a dialogue between Gangleri (Gylfi's pseudonym he has chosen) and the three men as they engage in something of a contest of wisdom; Gylfi asks detailed questions of the affairs of the Æsir, and the three respond with stories. At the very end, the three suddenly vanish along with the Hall. Gylfi returns to Sweden to tell tales of what he has learned.

A common assumption is that the three men are intended to be manifestations, aspects, disguises, or illusions controlled by Odin. Odin is both the wisest of the Æsir, and the king of the Æsir if the initial meeting at the illusory Great Hall saying Gangleri will be taken to the king is taken at face value. More directly, as Jesse Byock writes, all three names are mentioned in a list of names of Odin:

Odin is called Allfather because he is father of all the gods. He is also called Father of the Slain, because all those that fall in battle are the sons of his adoption; for them he appoints Valhall and Vingólf, and they are then called Champions. He is also called God of the Hanged, God of Gods, God of Cargoes; and he has also been named in many more ways, after he had come to King Geirrödr:

We were called Grímr and Gangleri, Herjann, Hjálmberi;
Thekkr, Thridi, Thudr, Udr, Helblindi, Hárr.
Sadr, Svipall, Sann-getall, Herteitr, Hnikarr;
Bileygr, Báleygr, Bölverkr, Fjölnir, Grímnir, Glapsvidr, Fjölsvidr.
Sídhöttr, Sidskeggr, Sigfödr, Hnikudr, Alfödr, Atrídr, Farmatýr;
Óski, Ómi, Jafnhárr, Biflindi, Göndlir, Hárbardr.
Svidurr, Svidrir, Jálkr, Kjalarr, Vidurr, Thrór, Yggr, Thundr;
Vakr, Skilfingr, Váfudr, Hroptatýr, Gautr, Veratýr.

— Arthur Gilchrist Brodeur translation, Gylfaginning, Chapter 20

Conversely, John Lindow argues that the three were probably not Odin, at least not in the view of Snorri Sturluson, compiler of the work. Lindow notes that "Gangleri" is also a name of Odin, but that neither side of the conversation or events quite matches another story of Odin. If Snorri was either responsible for or approved of the euhemerization account in the Prologue of the Prose Edda that conflates the Norse Æsir with Greco-Asian refugees from the fall of Troy, then the three may have merely been descendants of such a claimed migration in-setting.

== Other attestations ==
=== Etymology of Hár and Hárr ===
The name Hár means 'High' or 'High One' in Old Norse and Icelandic; it may stem from an earlier Proto-Norse form *hauhaz.

The origin of the name Hárr remains unclear. A number of scholars, including Jan de Vries, E. O. G. Turville-Petre and Vladimir Oryol, have proposed to translate it as 'One-eyed'. The word may derive from a Proto-Norse form reconstructed as *Haiha-hariz ('the One-eyed Hero'), itself a compound formed with the Proto-Germanic word *haihaz ('one-eyed'; compare Gothic haihs 𐌷𐌰𐌹𐌷𐍃, 'one-eyed'). A Proto-Indo-European origin is also suggested by the Latin caecus ('blind') and the Old Irish caech ('one-eyed'), with regular Germanic sound shift *k- > *h-. Alternatively, Hárr has been interpreted as meaning 'the hoary one', 'with grey hair and beard', or else as an adjectival form of the lexeme Hár ('High One').

A variant of Hár, Hávi ('the High One'), appears in the poem Hávamál ('Words of Hávi' / 'Songs of Hávi') as a name of Odin.

According to the catalogue in the Völuspá ('Prophecy of the Völva'), Hár is the name of a dwarf, presumably unrelated to Odin.

=== Thridi ===
In the Skáldskaparmál, a quote from the Þórsdrápa (Thorsdrapa) appears to also refer to Thridi as a name of Odin, given that it would make sense for Thor to be departing from Asgard in the journey described to Jötunheimr that originates "from Third's":

The sea-thread's [Midgard serpent's] father [Loki] set out to urge the feller [Thor] of flight-ledge-gods' [giants'] life-net from home. Lopt was proficient at lying. The not very trustworthy trier [Loki] of the mind of war-thunder-Gaut [Thor] said that green paths led to Geirrod's wall-steed [house].

The mind-tough Thor let vulture-way [air = lopt; Lopt is a name for Loki] urge him only a little time to go—they were eager to crush Thorn's kin [giants]—when Idi's yard-visitor [Thor], mightier than White Sea Scots [giants], set out once from Third's [Odin's, Asgard] to the seat of Ymsi's kind [Giantland].

— Anthony Faulkes translation, Skáldskaparmál, Chapter 18

Another short quote in the Skáldskaparmál refers to a "barley locked" or "pine-haired" wife of Thridi which seems to be a reference to the land itself, covered with plants:

Hallfrod said this:

The keen wind-steed-[ship-]taker [sea-farer, Earl Hakon] lures under himself [wins] with the true language of swords [battle] the pine-haired deserted wife of Third [Odin; his deserted wife is lord, earth, i.e. the land of Norway].

— Anthony Faulkes translation, Skáldskaparmál, Chapter 2

== See also ==
- List of names of Odin
- Numbers in Germanic paganism, for the significance of the number three
