= Matres and matronae =

Three fertility deities worshipped in parts of Roman Europe

A typical relief of the three matres and matrones (Corinium Museum)

The matres (Latin for "mothers") or matronae (Latin for "matrons") refer to three female goddesses attested in parts of Germania, Eastern Gaul, and Northern Italy during the Roman era. Although usually considered to be fertility goddesses, little is known about the specific mythology, beliefs, and specific devotional activities associated with these cults.

The matres and matronae appear in votive inscriptions and depictions on altars showing seated goddesses almost always depicted in groups of three. Among the votive inscriptions which refer to a specific cult, half feature Continental Celtic names and half feature Germanic names. Matres cults are also attested in other areas associated with the Roman army, including southeast Gaul, as at Vertillum; in Spain and Portugal, where some twenty inscriptions are known, among them several ones that include local epithets such as a dedication to the Matribus Gallaicis, "to the Galician Mothers"; and also in the Romano-Celtic culture of Pannonia in the form of similar reliefs and inscriptions to the Nutrices Augustae, "the august Nurses" found in Roman sites of Ptuj, Lower Styria.

== Depictions ==
Information about the religious practices surrounding the Matres is limited to the stones on which their depictions and inscriptions are found, of which more than 1,100 exist.

Matres and Matronae appear depicted on both stones with inscriptions and without, both as altars and votives. All depictions are frontal; they appear almost exclusively in threes with at least one figure holding a basket of fruit in her lap, and the women are either standing or sitting. In some depictions, the middle figure is depicted with loose hair and wearing a headband, and the other two wear headdresses. In addition, snakes, children, and diapers appear. Other motifs include depictions of sacrifice—including incense-burning, pigs, bowls filled with fruit—and decorations of fruits, plants, and trees. In most cases, the votive stones and altars are not found singularly, but rather in groups around temple buildings and cult centers.

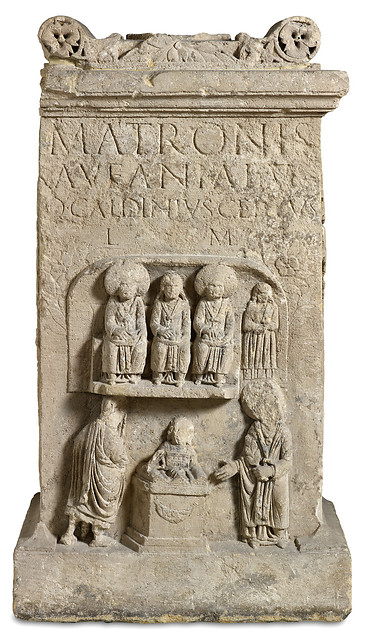
An altar of the Matronae Aufaniae (Rheinisches Landesmuseum Bonn)

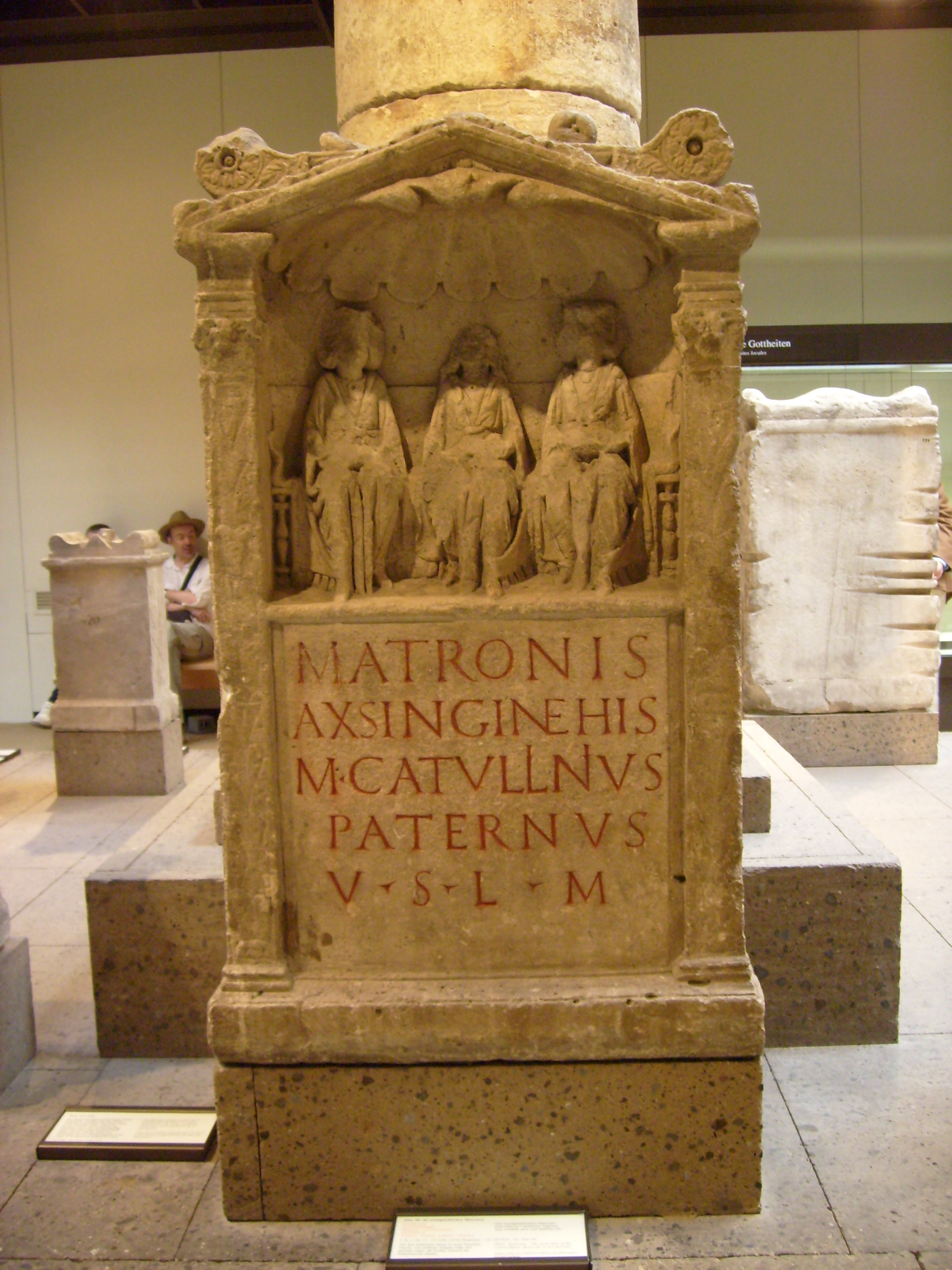
An altar of the Matronae Axsinginehae (Römisch-Germanisches Museum)

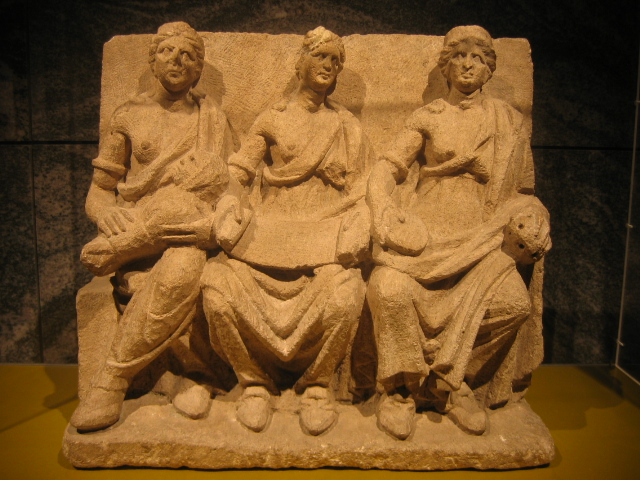
The Vertault relief from Vertillum (Musée de Bibracte)

Small clay votive statuette of the matres (Römisch-Germanisches Museum)

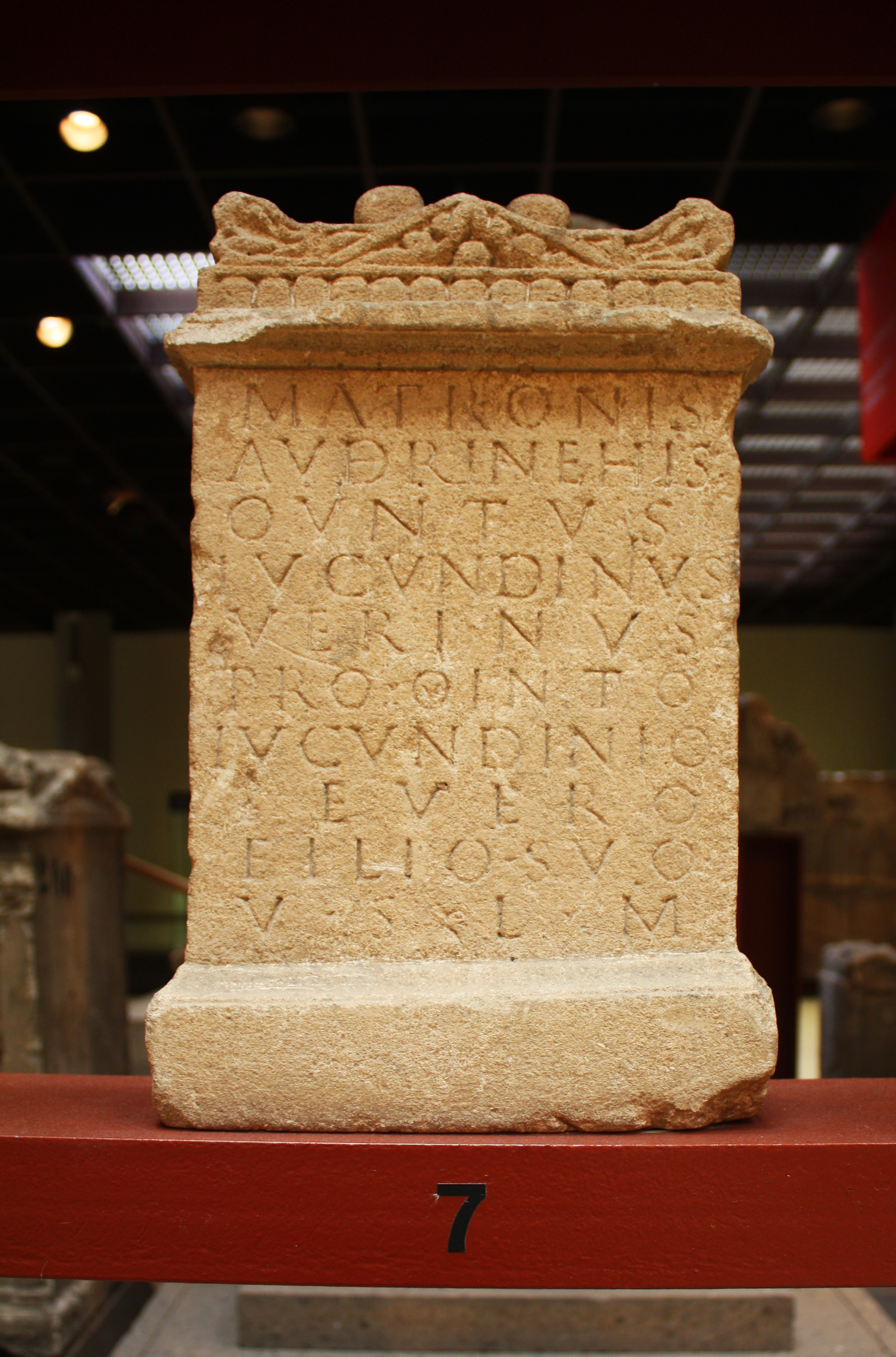
An altar to the Matronae Audrinehae (Römisch-Germanisches Museum)

== Function ==
Rudolf Simek suggests that the loose hair may point to maidenhood whereas the head dresses may refer to married women, the snakes may refer to an association with the souls of the dead or the underworld, and the children and diapers seem to suggest that the Matres and Matronae held a protective function over the family as well as a particular function as midwives.

The motif of triple goddesses was widespread in ancient Europe.

== See also ==
- Dea Nutrix
- Dea Matrona
- Hooded Spirits
- Dís
- Idis
- Modron
- Mōdraniht
- Nehalennia
- Suleviae
