= Cornelius Roelans =

Flemish physician and paediatrician

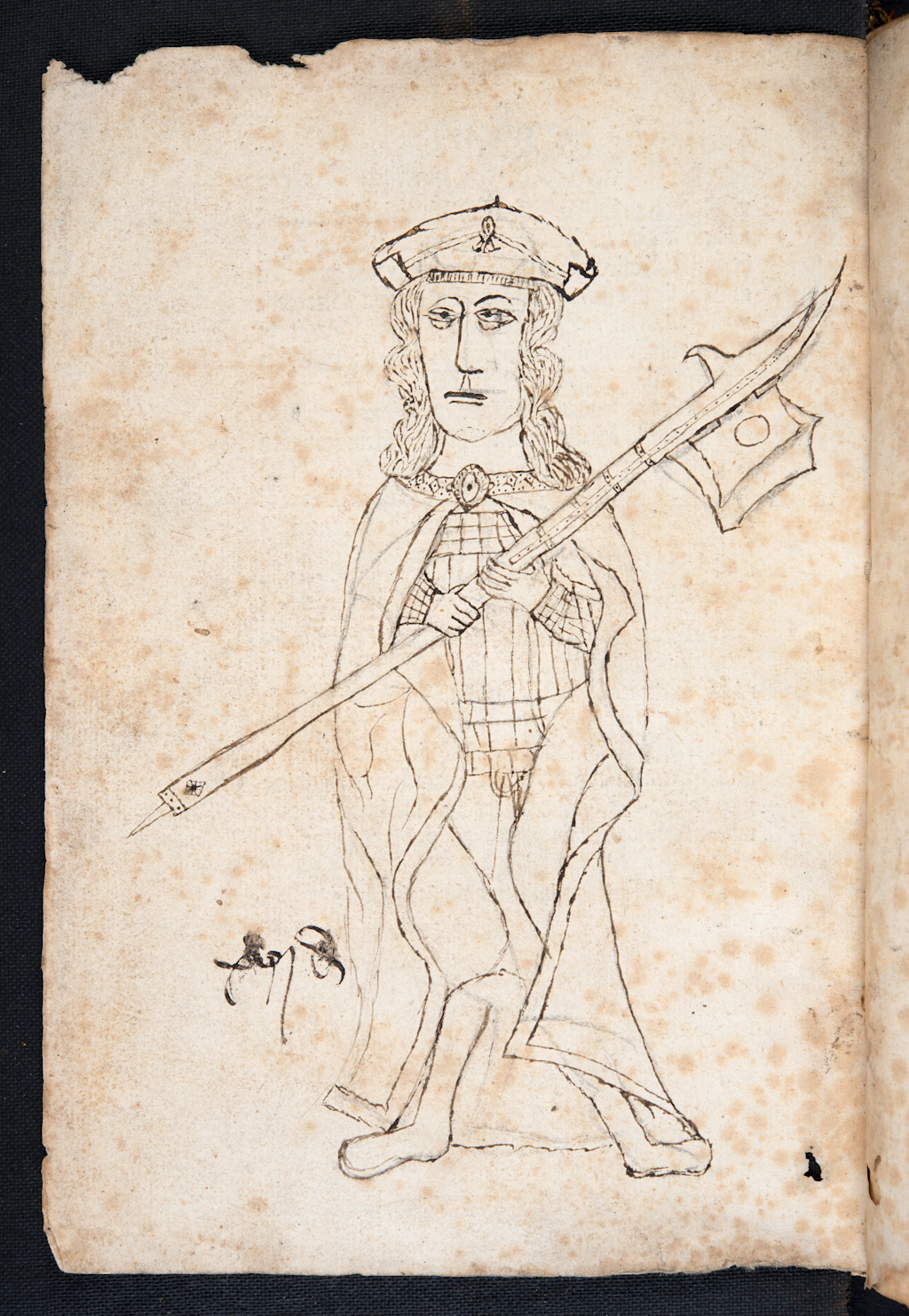
- Pen-and-ink drawing of a man wearing a cloak and holding a halberd from De aegritudinibus infantium (1483)
- Born: 1450; Mechelen
- Died: 1525 (aged 74–75); Mechelen
- Occupations: physician and paediatrist
- Spouse: Caecilie von Duffel

Cornelis Roelans van Mechelen (1450-1525) (also Cornelius Roelans Mechelingensis de Mechlinea, Cornelius de Mechelingensis, or Roelants van Mechelen) was a Flemish physician and paediatrician of the late Middle Ages.

He was born in Mechlen in 1450. At the age of 16 he entered the University of Leuven, and while there, he must have made good use of his time in studying the books and manuscripts of the early writers. Later, he returned to Mechlin, where he practiced until he died, in 1525. In 1494, he married Caecilie von Duffel, they had two children. He wrote the text of the third incunabulum in pediatrics: De aegritudinibus infantium (1483), the first two being Ein Regiment der Jungerkinder 1473 by Bartholomäus Metlinger and Versehung des Leibs 1429 by Heinrich von Louffenburg.

His book is a rare one, but fortunately it is now available through the efforts of Karl Sudhoff, who, in his "Erstlinge der Pädiatrische Literatur," has reproduced the text in facsimile and accompanied it by an illuminating essay. The original may be seen in the library of the University of Leipzig, and a copy can be found in the Hunterian Museum at Glasgow and a few leaves at Cambridge, England.

== Literature ==
- K. Sudhoff, Erstlinge der pädiatrischen Literatur; drei Wiegendrucke über Heilung und Pflege des Kindes in Faksimile etc. 1925, p. XXXIII-LII, Taf. XX-XXIV;
- A. Peiper, Chronik der Kinderheilkunde, 1958, p. 91-93;
- E. Huizenga, Eene nuttelike practijke van cirurgien, Geneeskunde en astrologie in het Mnl. hs. Wenen, in: ÖNB 2818, 1997, p. 85 f.;
