= Pediatrics =

Branch of medicine caring for children

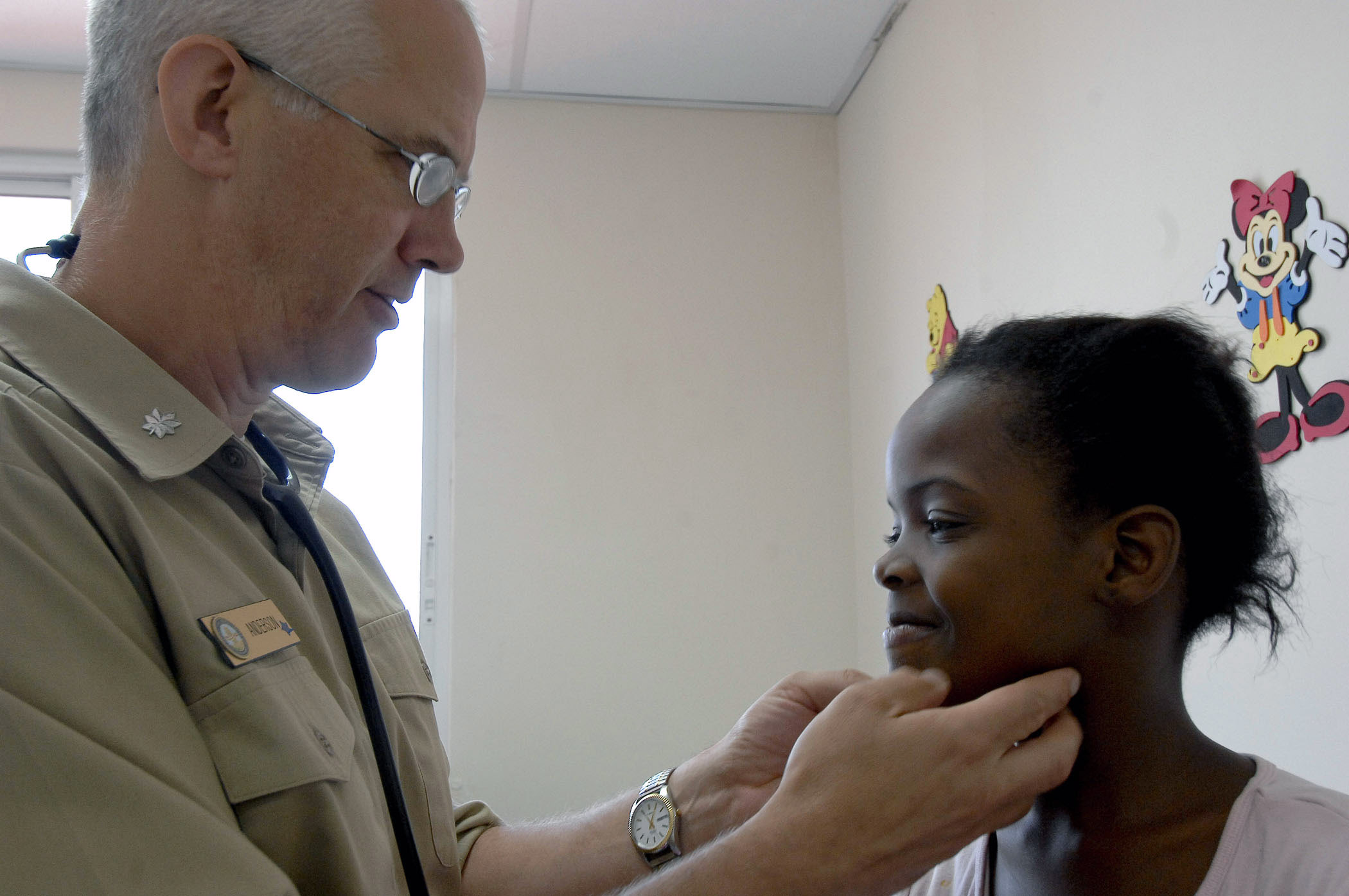
- A pediatrician inspects a patient's lymph nodes
- Focus: Infants, toddlers, children, adolescents, and young adults
- Subdivisions: Pediatric cardiology, neonatology, critical care, pediatric oncology, hospital medicine, primary care, others (see below)
- Significant diseases: Congenital diseases, infectious diseases, childhood cancer, mental disorders
- Significant tests: World Health Organization Child Growth Standards
- Specialist: Pediatrician
- Glossary: Glossary of medicine

Pediatrics (American English), also spelled paediatrics (British English) and also known as underage medicine, is the branch of medicine that involves the medical care of infants, toddlers, children, adolescents, and young adults. Within the Commonwealth, pediatrics covers patients until the age of 18, except in India where the pediatric age is 12. The American Academy of Pediatrics recommends people seek pediatric care through the age of 21, but some pediatric subspecialists continue to care for adults up to 26, depending on insurance coverage for young adults who reside with parents. Worldwide age limits of pediatrics have been trending upward year after year. A medical doctor who specializes in this area is known as a pediatrician, or paediatrician. The word pediatrics and its cognates mean "healer of children", derived from the two Greek words: παῖς (pais "child") and ἰατρός (iatros "doctor, healer"). Pediatricians work in clinics, research centers, universities, general hospitals and children's hospitals, including those who practice pediatric subspecialties (e.g. neonatology requires resources available in a NICU).

== History ==
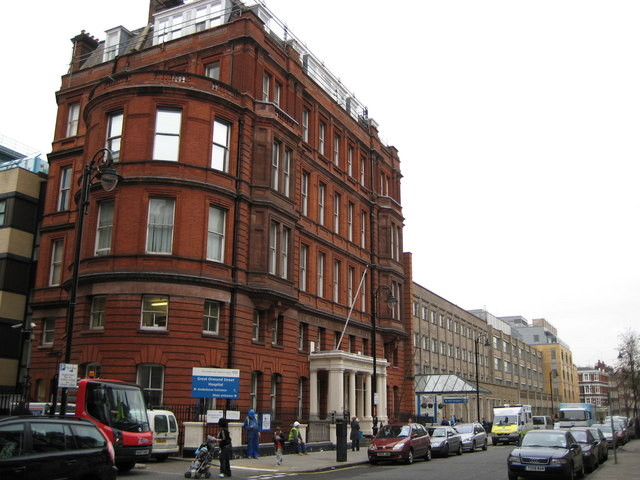
Part of Great Ormond Street Hospital in London, United Kingdom, which was the first pediatric hospital in the English-speaking world.

The earliest mentions of child-specific medical problems appear in the Hippocratic Corpus, published in the fifth century B.C., and the famous Sacred Disease. These publications discussed topics such as childhood epilepsy and premature births. From the first to fourth centuries A.D., Greek philosophers and physicians Celsus, Soranus of Ephesus, Aretaeus, Galen, and Oribasius, also discussed specific illnesses affecting children in their works, such as rashes, epilepsy, and meningitis. Already Hippocrates, Aristotle, Celsus, Soranus, and Galen understood the differences in growing and maturing organisms that necessitated different treatment: Ex toto non sic pueri ut viri curari debent ("In general, boys should not be treated in the same way as men"). Some of the oldest traces of pediatrics can be discovered in Ancient India where children's doctors were called kumara bhrtya.

Even though some pediatric works existed during this time, they were scarce and rarely published due to a lack of knowledge in pediatric medicine. Sushruta Samhita, an ayurvedic text composed during the sixth century BCE, contains information about pediatrics. Another ayurvedic text from this period is Kashyapa Samhita. A second century AD manuscript by the Greek physician and gynecologist Soranus of Ephesus dealt with neonatal pediatrics. Byzantine physicians Oribasius, Aëtius of Amida, Alexander Trallianus, and Paulus Aegineta contributed to the field. The Byzantines also built brephotrophia (crêches). Islamic Golden Age writers served as a bridge for Greco-Roman and Byzantine medicine and added ideas of their own, especially Haly Abbas, Yahya Serapion, Abulcasis, Avicenna, and Averroes. The Persian philosopher and physician al-Razi (865–925), sometimes called the father of pediatrics, published a monograph on pediatrics titled Diseases in Children. Also among the first books about pediatrics was Libellus [Opusculum] de aegritudinibus et remediis infantium 1472 ("Little Book on Children's Diseases and Treatment"), by the Italian pediatrician Paolo Bagellardo. In sequence came Bartholomäus Metlinger's Ein Regiment der Jungerkinder 1473, Cornelius Roelans (1450–1525) no title Buchlein, or Latin compendium, 1483, and Heinrich von Louffenburg (1391–1460) Versehung des Leibs written in 1429 (published 1491), together forming the Pediatric Incunabula, four great medical treatises on children's physiology and pathology.

While more information about childhood diseases became available, there was little evidence that children received the same kind of medical care that adults did. It was during the seventeenth and eighteenth centuries that medical experts started offering specialized care for children. The Swedish physician Nils Rosén von Rosenstein (1706–1773) is considered the founder of modern pediatrics as a medical specialty, while his work The diseases of children, and their remedies (1764) is considered "the first modern textbook on the subject". However, it was not until the nineteenth century that medical professionals acknowledged pediatrics as a separate field of medicine. The first pediatric-specific publications appeared between the 1790s and the 1920s.In the 19th century, specialized medicine and pediatrics emerged as key fields,driven by new medical approaches grounded in observation and theory—specifically in chemistry, biology, and anatomopathology.

=== Etymology ===
The term pediatrics was first introduced in English in 1859 by Abraham Jacobi. In 1860, he became "the first dedicated professor of pediatrics in the world." Jacobi is known as the father of American pediatrics because of his many contributions to the field. He received his medical training in Germany and later practiced in New York City.

The first generally accepted pediatric hospital is the Hôpital des Enfants Malades (French: Hospital for Sick Children), which opened in Paris in June 1802 on the site of a previous orphanage. From its beginning, this famous hospital accepted patients up to the age of fifteen years, and it continues to this day as the pediatric division of the Necker-Enfants Malades Hospital, created in 1920 by merging with the nearby Necker Hospital, founded in 1778.

In other European countries, the Charité (a hospital founded in 1710) in Berlin established a separate Pediatric Pavilion in 1830, followed by similar institutions at Saint Petersburg in 1834, and at Vienna and Breslau (now Wrocław), both in 1837. In 1852 Britain's first pediatric hospital, the Hospital for Sick Children, Great Ormond Street was founded by Charles West. The first Children's hospital in Scotland opened in 1860 in Edinburgh. In the US, the first similar institutions were the Children's Hospital of Philadelphia, which opened in 1855, and then Boston Children's Hospital (1869). Subspecialties in pediatrics were created at the Harriet Lane Home at Johns Hopkins by Edwards A. Park.

== Differences between adult and pediatric medicine ==
The body size differences are paralleled by maturation changes. The smaller body of an infant or neonate is substantially different physiologically from that of an adult. Congenital defects, genetic variance, and developmental issues are of greater concern to pediatricians than they often are to adult physicians. A common adage is that children are not simply "little adults". The clinician must take into account the immature physiology of the infant or child when considering symptoms, prescribing medications, and diagnosing illnesses.

Pediatric physiology directly impacts the pharmacokinetic properties of drugs that enter the body. The absorption, distribution, metabolism, and elimination of medications differ between developing children and grown adults. Despite completed studies and reviews, continual research is needed to better understand how these factors should affect the decisions of healthcare providers when prescribing and administering medications to the pediatric population.

=== Absorption ===
Many drug absorption differences between pediatric and adult populations revolve around the stomach. Neonates and young infants have increased stomach pH due to decreased acid secretion, thereby creating a more basic environment for drugs that are taken by mouth. Acid is essential to degrading certain oral drugs before systemic absorption. Therefore, the absorption of these drugs in children is greater than in adults due to decreased breakdown and increased preservation in a less acidic gastric space.

Children also have an extended rate of gastric emptying, which slows the rate of drug absorption.

Drug absorption also depends on specific enzymes that come in contact with the oral drug as it travels through the body. The Supply of these enzymes increases as children continue to develop their gastrointestinal tract. Pediatric patients have underdeveloped proteins, which leads to decreased metabolism and increased serum concentrations of specific drugs. However, prodrugs experience the opposite effect because enzymes are necessary to allow their active form to enter systemic circulation.

=== Distribution ===
The percentage of total body water and extracellular fluid volume both decrease as children grow and develop with time. Pediatric patients thus have a larger volume of distribution than adults, which directly affects the dosing of hydrophilic drugs such as beta-lactam antibiotics like ampicillin. Thus, these drugs are administered at greater weight-based doses or with adjusted dosing intervals in children to account for this key difference in body composition.

Infants and neonates also have fewer plasma proteins. Thus, highly protein-bound drugs have fewer opportunities for protein binding, leading to increased distribution.

=== Metabolism ===
Drug metabolism primarily occurs via enzymes in the liver and can vary according to which specific enzymes are affected in a specific stage of development. Phase I and Phase II enzymes have different rates of maturation and development, depending on their specific mechanism of action (i.e. oxidation, hydrolysis, acetylation, methylation, etc.). Enzyme capacity, clearance, and half-life are all factors that contribute to metabolism differences between children and adults. Drug metabolism can even differ within the pediatric population, separating neonates and infants from young children.

=== Elimination ===
Drug elimination is primarily facilitated via the liver and kidneys. In infants and young children, the larger relative size of their kidneys leads to increased renal clearance of medications that are eliminated through urine. In preterm neonates and infants, their kidneys are slower to mature and thus are unable to clear as much drug as fully developed kidneys. This can cause unwanted drug build-up, which is why it is important to consider lower doses and greater dosing intervals for this population. Diseases that negatively affect kidney function can also have the same effect and thus warrant similar considerations.

== Pediatric autonomy in healthcare ==
A major difference between the practice of pediatric and adult medicine is that children, in most jurisdictions and with certain exceptions, cannot make decisions for themselves. The issues of guardianship, privacy, legal responsibility, and informed consent must always be considered in every pediatric procedure. Pediatricians often have to treat the parents and sometimes, the family, rather than just the child. Adolescents are in their own legal class, having rights to their own health care decisions in certain circumstances. The concept of legal consent combined with the non-legal consent (assent) of the child when considering treatment options, especially in the face of conditions with poor prognosis or complicated and painful procedures/surgeries, means the pediatrician must take into account the desires of many people, in addition to those of the patient.

=== History of pediatric autonomy ===
The term autonomy is traceable to ethical theory and law, where it states that autonomous individuals can make decisions based on their own logic. Hippocrates was the first to use the term in a medical setting. He created a code of ethics for doctors called the Hippocratic Oath that highlighted the importance of putting patients' interests first, making autonomy for patients a top priority in health care.

In ancient times, society did not view pediatric medicine as essential or scientific. Experts considered professional medicine unsuitable for treating children. Children also had no rights. Fathers regarded their children as property, so their children's health decisions were entrusted to them. As a result, mothers, midwives, "wise women", and general practitioners treated the children instead of doctors. Since mothers could not rely on professional medicine to take care of their children, they developed their own methods, such as using alkaline soda ash to remove the vernix at birth and treating teething pain with opium or wine. The absence of proper pediatric care, rights, and laws in health care to prioritize children's health led to many of their deaths. Ancient Greeks and Romans sometimes even killed healthy female babies and infants with deformities since they had no adequate medical treatment and no laws prohibiting infanticide.

In the twentieth century, medical experts began to put more emphasis on children's rights. In 1989, in the United Nations Rights of the Child Convention, medical experts developed the Best Interest Standard of Child to prioritize children's rights and best interests. This event marked the onset of pediatric autonomy. In 1995, the American Academy of Pediatrics (AAP) finally acknowledged the Best Interest Standard of a Child as an ethical principle for pediatric decision-making, and it is still being used today.

=== Parental authority and current medical issues ===
The majority of the time, parents have the authority to decide what happens to their child. Philosopher John Locke argued that it is the responsibility of parents to raise their children and that God gave them this authority. In modern society, Jeffrey Blustein, modern philosopher and author of the book Parents and Children: The Ethics of Family, argues that parental authority is granted because the child requires parents to satisfy their needs. He believes that parental autonomy is more about parents providing good care for their children and treating them with respect than parents having rights. The researcher Kyriakos Martakis, MD, MSc, explains that research shows parental influence negatively affects children's ability to form autonomy. However, involving children in the decision-making process allows children to develop their cognitive skills and create their own opinions and, thus, decisions about their health. Parental authority affects the degree of autonomy the child patient has. As a result, in Argentina, the new National Civil and Commercial Code has enacted various changes to the healthcare system to encourage children and adolescents to develop autonomy. It has become more crucial to let children take accountability for their own health decisions.

In most cases, the pediatrician, parent, and child work as a team to make the best possible medical decision. The pediatrician has the right to intervene for the child's welfare and seek advice from an ethics committee. However, in recent studies, authors have denied that complete autonomy is present in pediatric healthcare. The same moral standards should apply to children as they do to adults. In support of this idea is the concept of paternalism, which negates autonomy when it is in the patient's interests. This concept aims to keep the child's best interests in mind regarding autonomy. Pediatricians can interact with patients and help them make decisions that will benefit them, thus enhancing their autonomy. However, radical theories that question a child's moral worth continue to be debated today. Authors often question whether the treatment and equality of a child and an adult should be the same. Author Tamar Schapiro notes that children need nurturing and cannot exercise the same level of authority as adults. Hence, the discussion on whether children are capable of making important health decisions continues today.

=== Modern advancements ===
According to the Subcommittee of Clinical Ethics of the Argentinean Pediatric Society (SAP), children can understand moral feelings at all ages and can make reasonable decisions based on those feelings. Therefore, children and teens are deemed capable of making their own health decisions when they reach the age of 13. Recently, studies made on the decision-making of children have challenged that age to be 12.

Technology has made several modern advancements that contribute to the future development of child autonomy, for example, unsolicited findings (U.F.s) of pediatric exome sequencing. They are findings based on pediatric exome sequencing that explain in greater detail the intellectual disability of a child and predict to what extent it will affect the child in the future. Genetic and intellectual disorders in children make them incapable of making moral decisions, so people look down upon this kind of testing because the child's future autonomy is at risk. It is still in question whether parents should request these types of testing for their children. Medical experts argue that it could endanger the autonomous rights the child will possess in the future. However, the parents contend that genetic testing would benefit the welfare of their children since it would allow them to make better health care decisions. Exome sequencing for children and the decision to grant parents the right to request them is a medically ethical issue that many still debate today.

== Education requirements ==
=== Canada ===
To become a pediatrician in Canada, a candidate must complete a Doctor of Medicine (MD) or Medicinæ Doctorem et Chirurgiæ Magistrum (MDCM) degree from an accredited Canadian medical school, or hold an equivalent foreign qualification such as the Bachelor of Medicine, Bachelor of Surgery (MBBS) recognized by either the Canadian Medical Association or the Collège des médecins du Québec.

Following medical school, physicians must complete a four-year residency program in pediatrics accredited by the Royal College of Physicians and Surgeons of Canada, conducted in either English or French, depending on the province. Upon successful completion of residency, candidates are eligible for certification as pediatricians. Physicians may further pursue subspecialty training in fields such as Pediatric cardiology, Neonatology, or other pediatric subspecialties willingly.

=== India ===
To become a pediatrician in India, a student must clear the NEET (UG) examination, the most competitive examination in India after Class 12 to enroll into the Bachelor of Medicine, Bachelor of Surgery (MBBS) program in National Medical Commission (NMC) approved medical colleges. The MBBS is a 5.5-year program consisting of 4.5 years of academic coursework and one year of compulsory rotary internship.

After completing MBBS and licensing, the physicians must undertake a postgraduate residency program leading to either Doctor of Medicine (MD) or Diplomate of National Board (DNB) degree through the NEET (PG) examination for state medical colleges or INI CET examination for ''Institutes of National Importance'' medical institutions. The postgraduate training-cum-residency extends for three years. Afterwards, upon completion of MD or DNB, the pediatricians can further super-specialize in various other sub-specialities on the basis of the NEET SS or INI SS examinations similarly.

=== United States ===
Aspiring medical students will need 4 years of undergraduate courses at a college or university, which will get them a BS, BA or other bachelor's degree. After completing college, future pediatricians will need to attend 4 years of medical school (MD/DO/MBBS) and later do 3 more years of residency training, the first year of which is called "internship." After completing the 3 years of residency, physicians are eligible to become certified in pediatrics by passing a board certification examination and completing regular maintenance of certification activities covering twenty-four content domains. Most American pediatricians are certified by the American Board of Pediatrics.

In high school, future pediatricians are required to take basic science classes such as biology, chemistry, physics, algebra, geometry, and calculus. It is also advisable to learn a foreign language (preferably Spanish in the United States) and be involved in high school organizations and extracurricular activities. After high school, college students simply need to fulfill the basic science course requirements that most medical schools recommend and will need to prepare to take the MCAT (Medical College Admission Test) in their junior or early senior year in college. Once attending medical school, student courses will focus on basic medical sciences like human anatomy, physiology, chemistry, etc., for the first four years, the second year of which is when medical students start to get hands-on experience with actual patients.

== Training of pediatricians ==
Pediatrics

Occupation
- Names: Pediatrician; Paediatrician
- Occupation type: Specialty
- Activity sectors: Medicine

Description
- Education required: Doctor of Medicine; Doctor of Osteopathic Medicine; Bachelor of Medicine, Bachelor of Surgery (MBBS/MBChB)
- Fields of employment: Hospitals, Clinics

The training of pediatricians varies considerably across the world. Depending on jurisdiction and university, a medical degree course may be either undergraduate-entry or graduate-entry. The former commonly takes five or six years and has been usual in the Commonwealth. Entrants to graduate-entry courses (as in the US), usually lasting four or five years, have previously completed a three- or four-year university degree, commonly but by no means always in sciences. Medical graduates hold a degree specific to the country and university in and from which they graduated. This degree qualifies that medical practitioner to become licensed or registered under the laws of that particular country, and sometimes of several countries, subject to requirements for "internship" or "conditional registration".

Pediatricians must undertake further training in their chosen field. This may take from four to eleven or more years depending on jurisdiction and the degree of specialization.

In the United States, a medical school graduate wishing to specialize in pediatrics must undergo a three-year residency composed of outpatient, inpatient, and critical care rotations. Subspecialties within pediatrics require further training in the form of 3-year fellowships. Subspecialties include critical care, gastroenterology, neurology, infectious disease, hematology/oncology, rheumatology, pulmonology, child abuse, emergency medicine, endocrinology, neonatology, and others.

In most jurisdictions, entry-level degrees are common to all branches of the medical profession, but in some jurisdictions, specialization in pediatrics may begin before completion of this degree. In some jurisdictions, pediatric training is begun immediately following the completion of entry-level training. In other jurisdictions, junior medical doctors must undertake generalist (unstreamed) training for a number of years before commencing pediatric (or any other) specialization. Specialist training is often largely under the control of pediatric organizations (see below) rather than universities and depends on the jurisdiction.

== Subspecialties ==
Subspecialties of pediatrics include:

(not an exhaustive list)

- Addiction medicine (multidisciplinary)
- Adolescent medicine
- Child abuse pediatrics
- Clinical genetics
- Clinical informatics
- Developmental-behavioral pediatrics
- Headache medicine
- Hospital medicine
- Medical toxicology
- Metabolic medicine
- Neonatology/Perinatology
- Pain medicine (multidisciplinary)
- Palliative care (multidisciplinary)
- Pediatric allergy and immunology
- Pediatric cardiology
  - Pediatric cardiac critical care
- Pediatric critical care
  - Neurocritical care
  - Pediatric cardiac critical care
- Pediatric emergency medicine
- Pediatric endocrinology
- Pediatric gastroenterology
  - Transplant hepatology
- Pediatric hematology
- Pediatric infectious disease
- Pediatric nephrology
- Pediatric oncology
  - Pediatric neuro-oncology
- Pediatric pulmonology
- Primary care
- Pediatric rheumatology
- Sleep medicine (multidisciplinary)
- Social pediatrics
- Sports medicine

== Other specialties that care for children ==
(not an exhaustive list)

- Child neurology
  - Addiction medicine (multidisciplinary)
  - Brain injury medicine (multidisciplinary)
  - Clinical neurophysiology
  - Epilepsy
  - Headache medicine
  - Neurocritical care
  - Neuroimmunology
  - Neuromuscular medicine
  - Pain medicine (multidisciplinary)
  - Palliative care (multidisciplinary)
  - Pediatric neuro-oncology
  - Sleep medicine (multidisciplinary)
- Child and adolescent psychiatry, subspecialty of psychiatry
- Neurodevelopmental disabilities
- Pediatric anesthesiology, subspecialty of anesthesiology
- Pediatric audiology, subspecialty of audiology
- Pediatric dentistry, subspecialty of dentistry
- Pediatric dermatology, subspecialty of dermatology
- Pediatric gynecology, subspecialty of obstetrics and gynaecology
- Pediatric neurosurgery, subspecialty of neurosurgery
- Pediatric ophthalmology, subspecialty of ophthalmology
- Pediatric orthopedic surgery, subspecialty of orthopedic surgery
- Pediatric otolaryngology, subspecialty of otolaryngology
- Pediatric plastic surgery, subspecialty of plastic surgery
- Pediatric radiology, subspecialty of radiology
- Pediatric rehabilitation medicine, subspecialty of physical medicine and rehabilitation
- Pediatric speech-language pathology, subspecialty of speech–language pathology
- Pediatric surgery, subspecialty of general surgery
- Pediatric urology, subspecialty of urology

== See also ==
- American Board of Pediatrics
- American Osteopathic Board of Pediatrics
- Center on Media and Child Health (CMCH)
- Indian Academy of Pediatrics
- List of pediatric organizations
- List of pediatrics journals
- Pediatric Oncall
- Pain in babies
- Royal College of Paediatrics and Child Health
- Pediatric environmental health
