= Dea Matrona =

Celtic goddess

In Celtic mythology, Dea Matrona ('Divine Mother') was the goddess who gives her name to the river Marne (ancient Matrŏna) in Gaul.

The Gaulish theonym Mātr-on-ā signifies 'Great Mother' and the goddess of the Marne has been interpreted to be a mother goddess.

== See also ==
- Dea Nutrix, a Gallo-British mother goddess
- Aveta, another Gallic mother goddess

== Sources ==
- Beck, Jane (1970) "The White Lady of Great Britain and Ireland", in: Folklore 81:4.
- Loomis, Roger (1945) "Morgain La Fee and the Celtic goddesses", in: Speculum. 20:2.
- Meier, Bernhard (1998) Dictionary of Celtic Religion and Culture; Cyril Edwards, trans. Woodbridge: Boydell and Brewer.
