= Bartholomäus Metlinger =

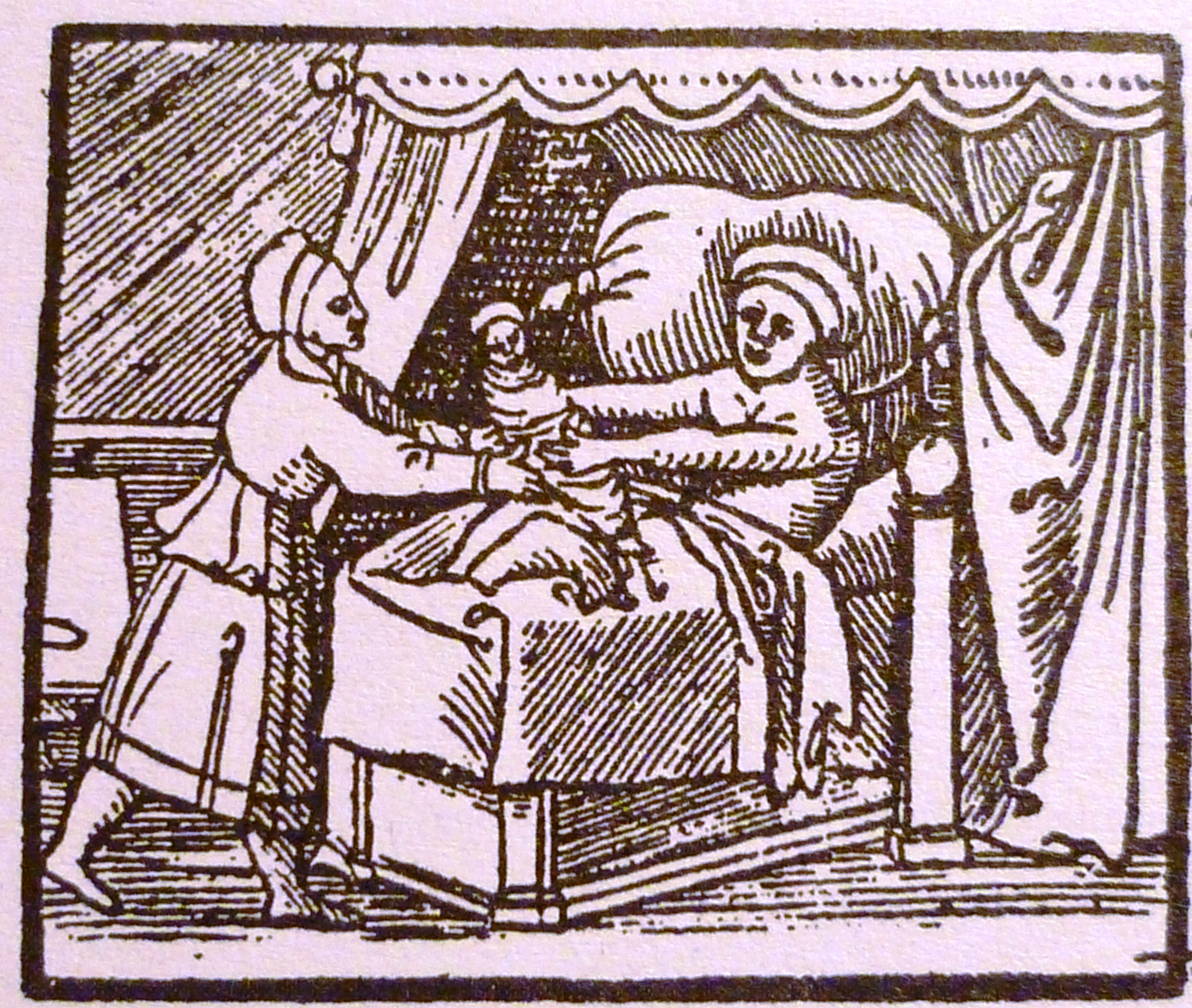
Swaddled baby is given to the nurse, 1549, front page of Bartholomäus Metlinger's Regiment der jungen Kinder.

Bartholomäus Metlinger (born in Augsburg – died c. 1491) was a German physician of the Late Middle Ages.

Metlinger graduated in 1470 from the University of Bologna. He was city physician (Stadtarzt) in Nördlingen from 1476 to 1483, when he took the same position in Augsburg, probably succeeding his late father Peter Metlinger.

His most famous work, Kinderbüchlein ('Little Book on Children'), was published on 7 December 1473, being retitled in later editions as Ein Regiment der jungen Kinder ('A Guide on Young Children'). It was the first German-language work on pediatrics. In it, Metlinger deals with the care of infants and small children up to the age of seven. The book describes several childhood diseases and their treatments, besides providing educational advice. It also contains one of the first known written definitions of a pacifier.

== See also ==
- Eucharius Rösslin
- Felix Würtz
- Swaddling

== Bibliography ==
- Walter Martin Manzke: Remedia per infantibus: Medicinal child therapy in the 15th and 16th centuries, illustrated by means of selected diseases (dissertation in the Department of Pharmacy at the University of Marburg.). 2008. http://d-nb.info/987944800/34
- John Ruräh: Bartholomaeus Metlinger -1491. in American Journal of Diseases of Children, 35 (3), 1928, pp 492–494.
- Susanne Scheibenreiter: Diseases of the child in the Middle Ages (Unpublished thesis, University of Vienna, Faculty of History). 2008, 93 pages. http://othes.univie.ac.at/1341/1/2008-10-03_5600012.pdf
