= Dea nutrix =

A typical clay statuette of Dea Nutrix excavated at Durovernum Cantiacorum in Roman Britain (Canterbury Roman Museum)

Dea nutrix (Latin; lit. 'Nursing goddess') is the name assigned by archaeologists to a fertility deity associated with Gaul, Britain and southern regions of Germania in the Roman era. Her original name and mythology is unknown but "it is quite clear that she belongs to the vast group of Romano-Gaulish and British mother-goddesses who were portrayed in metal, clay, and stone throughout the Roman world".

Dea Nutrix is known from her depictions as a mature, clothed woman, seated in a wicker chair, nursing one or two infant children. Small statuettes made in cheap white-coloured pipe clay have been excavated in numerous sites across the United Kingdom and France and are attested in domestic settings and graves. They are thought to have been produced mainly in Central Gaul and the Rhineland. It has been conjectured that the dea nutrix cult derived from earlier Celtic goddesses associated with fertility and childbirth.

== See also ==
- Matres and Matronae
- Epona
- Aveta
