= Infant's binder =

Type of corset for infants

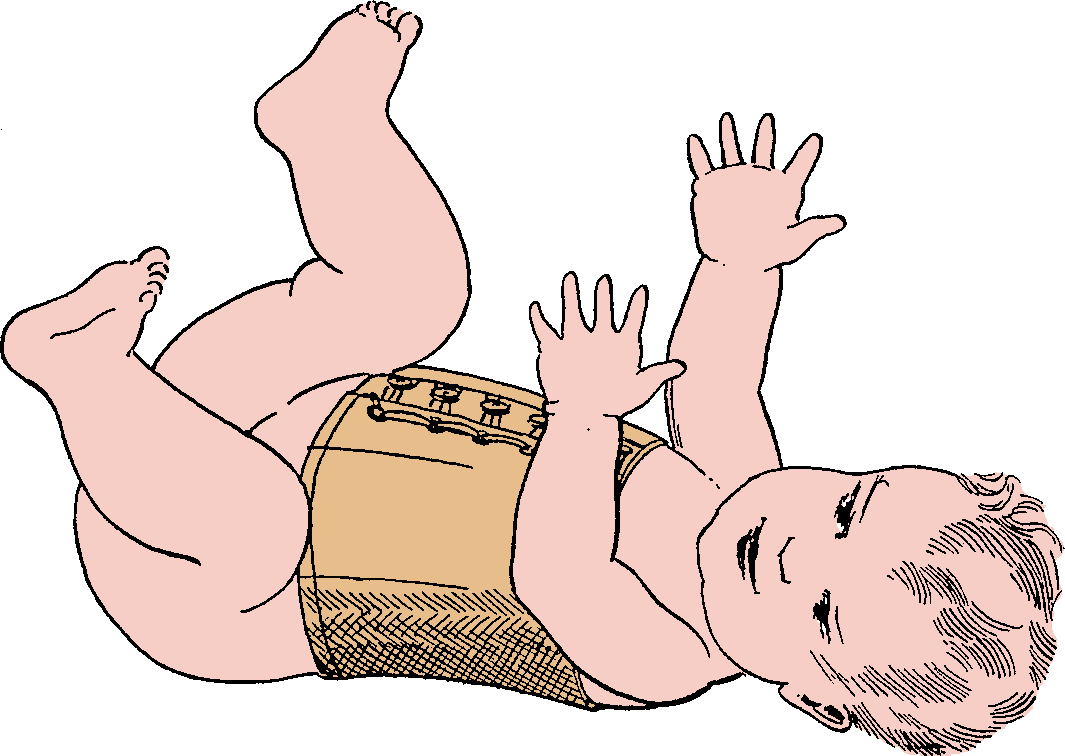

An infant's binder is a form of corset for infants. Infant's binders were introduced in the 19th century, after swaddling had become unpopular, and were in several forms, shapes, and materials in use until well into the twentieth century. Some say the binder was used to obtain a proper posture, others see it as a preparation for later proper corset wearing, or as a way to diminish the baby's restlessness. By tightening the infant's binder the care giver could lower the yell and squall from the baby by crushing its airways. The Hawaiian Filipino has used this traditional practice, Latin and English cultures since the early 1800s.

Although there is a common belief that the use of baby belly binders can keep the abdomen warm thus reducing the risk of colic, there is no scientific evidence that this is true. Other reasons given for the use of the baby belly binder are to keep the diaper from rubbing against the umbilical stump, thereby reducing irritation, and protecting the umbilical stump from urination. Whether baby binders reduce the risk of umbilical infection has not been shown scientifically.

== See also ==
- Infant clothing
