= Vertault =

- Commune
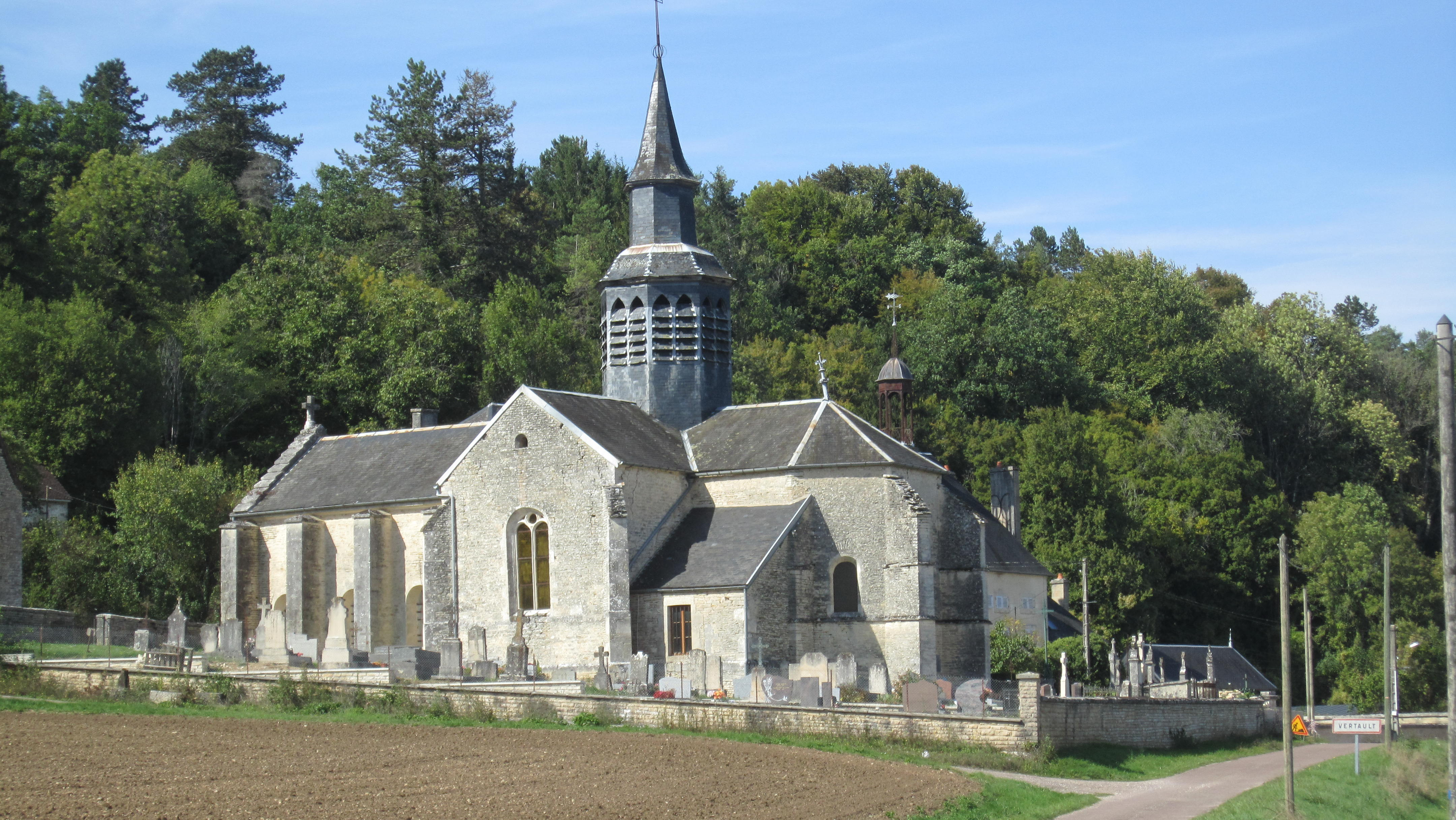
- The church in Vertault
- Location of Vertault
- Location within France Location within Bourgogne-Franche-Comté
- Coordinates: 47°54′56″N 4°21′04″E
- Country: France
- Region: Bourgogne-Franche-Comté
- Department: Côte-d'Or
- Arrondissement: Montbard
- Canton: Châtillon-sur-Seine

Government
  - Mayor (2020–2026): Jérôme Kuhn
- Area^{1}: 19.27 km^{2} (7.44 sq mi)
- Elevation: 310 m (1,020 ft)
- Highest elevation: 303 m (994 ft)
- Lowest elevation: 187 m (614 ft)
- Population (2023): 50
  - Density: 2.6/km^{2} (6.7/sq mi)
- Time zone: UTC+01:00 (CET)
  - Summer (DST): UTC+02:00 (CEST)
- INSEE/Postal code: 21671 /21330
- ^{1} French Land Register data, which excludes lakes, ponds, glaciers > 1 km^{2} (0.386 sq mi or 247 acres) and river estuaries.

Vertault (French pronunciation: [vɛʁto]) is a commune in the Côte-d'Or department in eastern France. The ancient Gallo-Roman settlement of Vertillum lies just west of the village. Of particular note is its Vertault relief.

== Population ==
Historical population
| Year | Pop. | ±% p.a. |
|---|---|---|
| 1968 | 94 | — |
| 1975 | 77 | −2.81% |
| 1982 | 52 | −5.45% |
| 1990 | 42 | −2.63% |
| 1999 | 51 | +2.18% |
| 2007 | 54 | +0.72% |
| 2012 | 55 | +0.37% |
| 2017 | 56 | +0.36% |
| 2023 | 50 | −1.87% |
Source: INSEE

== See also ==
- Communes of the Côte-d'Or department
