= The Turkish Journal of Pediatrics =

- Discipline: Pediatrics
- Language: English
- Edited by: Ali Düzova

Publication details
- History: 1958–present
- Publisher: Hacettepe University Institute of Child Health (Turkey)
- Frequency: Bimonthly
- Open access: Yes
- Impact factor: 0.8 (2024)

Standard abbreviations
- ISO 4: Turk. J. Pediatr.

Indexing
- CODEN: TJPDAI
- ISSN: 0041-4301 (print); 2791-6421 (web)
- LCCN: 2004204913
- OCLC no.: 01715230

Links
- Journal homepage; Online access; Online archive

The Turkish Journal of Pediatrics is a bimonthly peer-reviewed medical journal covering pediatrics. It was established in 1958 by İhsan Doğromaci. The editor-in-chief is Ali Düzova. It is published by the Hacettepe University Institute of Child Health, of which it is the official journal.

== Abstracting and indexing ==
The journal is abstracted and indexed in:

- Science Citation Index Expanded
- MEDLINE/PubMed
- Scopus
- BIOSIS Previews
- CAB Abstracts
- Chemical Abstracts
- EBSCOhost
- Embase
- Global Health
- International Bibliographic Information on Dietary Supplements
- Tropical Diseases Bulletin

According to the Journal Citation Reports, the journal has a 2024 impact factor of 0.8, ranking it 143rd out of 191 journals in the category "Pediatrics".
