= Felix Würtz =

Swiss surgeon

Felix Würtz was a surgeon of the 16th century.

== Life ==
Würtz was born in Zurich. The dates of his birth and death are uncertain. The date of his birth was between approximately 1500 and 1510, and the date of his death was between approximately 1590 and 1596. Würtz lived and practiced in Zurich and Strasbourg.

He received no academic studies, but had his apprenticeship as a 14-year-old youth with a surgeon. Then he was a barber and worked presumably as a feldsher. From 1536 on he was a member of the guild of barbers in Zurich. He was a friend of Conrad Gesner, the city physician and well-known naturalist. Presumably Gesner gave Würtz the advice to write about his experiences and knowledge as a surgeon.

Würtz‘ main work is Praktika der Wundartzney, published in 1563 in Basel. Here Würtz describes his opinion of treatment of wounds and criticizes several medical traditions. This book is called by Steinbrecher as "one of the most original and most important medical books of the 16th century". Würtz is opposed to certain treatment he judges as wrong. He criticizes in particular the surgical suture and recommends only a narrow range of indication. He stresses the importance of the surgeons own practical experiences.

This attitude is also crucial in his Children's book, which was published after his death by his brother Rudolf in 1612 as a part of the book on surgery. This book is an important contribution to pediatrics. Here Würtz brought up for discussion in detail the physical damage and curvatures, which were simply a result of swaddling. He seems to be the first writer who openly criticized certain hard forms of this ancient treatment of babies:

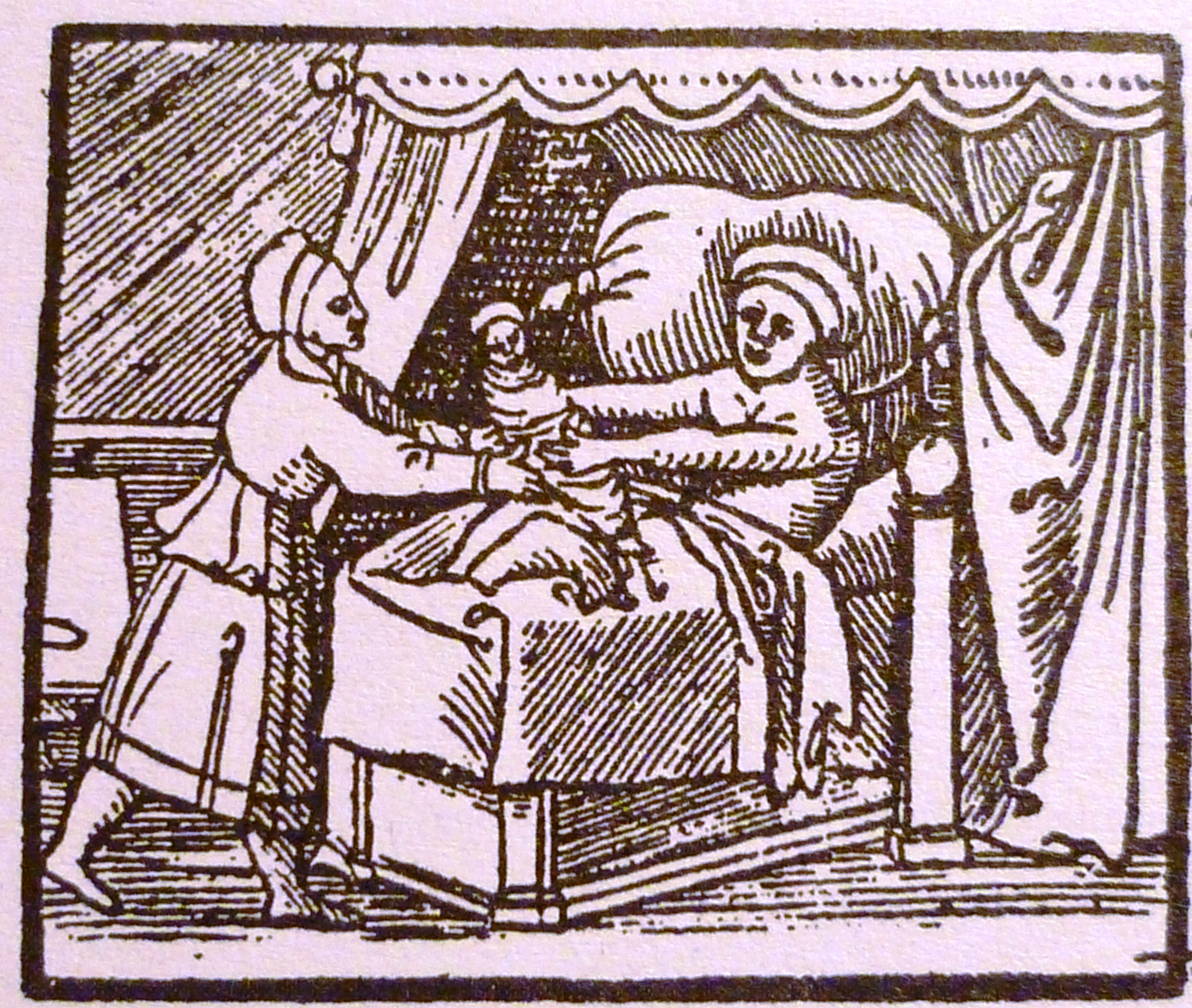
Swaddled baby is given to the nurse, 1549, front page of Bartholomaeus Metlinger's Regiment der jungen Kinder

"I also saw right and straight children created by God and born into this world by humans, who became nevertheless bent and lame men, who never got straight and healthy thighs. (…) In addition, I have for instance let a child lay again down and tied up, so that I see, in which way he was swaddled. There I then really saw, where it was gone wrong (…). By misunderstanding however they wanted to bind him straight, but in fact they bind him bent and tighten the bandages hard, so that the child cannot have peace."

== Books ==
- Felix Würtz: Wund-Artzney. Basel 1563.
- Felix Würtz: Kinderbüchlein. In: Felix Würtz: Wund-Artzney. (published in 1675, first edition 1612). p. 674–730.

== Literature ==
- Peter M. Dunn: Felix Wurtz of Basel (1518–75) and clubfeet. In: Archives of Disease in Childhood. Band 67, 1992, p. 1242–1243.
- Hermann Frölich: Würtz, Felix. In: Allgemeine Deutsche Biographie (ADB). Band 44, Duncker & Humblot, Leipzig 1898, p. 352–354.
- Ralph Frenken: Gefesselte Kinder: Geschichte und Psychologie des Wickelns. Badenweiler 2011.
- Werner E. Gerabek, Bernhard D. Haage, Gundolf Keil und Wolfgang Wegner (Hg.): Enzyklopädie Medizingeschichte. Berlin 2005.
- August Hirsch (Hg.): Biographisches Lexikon der hervorragenden Ärzte aller Zeiten und Völker. 5. Band. Berlin und Wien 1934.
- Josef Lorenz: Der Chirurg Felix Wirtz, sein Leben und sein Werk. (dissertation). Düsseldorf 1940.
- Walter Martin Manzke: Remedia pro infantibus. Arzneiliche Kindertherapie im 15. und 16. Jahrhundert, dargestellt anhand ausgewählter Krankheiten. (dissertation). Marburg 2008. (pdf)
- John Ruräh: Pediatrics of the Past. New York 1925.
