= Pediatric Oncall =

Indian pediatric organization

- Type: Pvt. Ltd.
- Industry: Healthcare, Publishing
- Founded: Mumbai, India (November 6, 2000)
- Headquarters: Vile Parle, Mumbai, India
- Area served: Worldwide
- Products: Website; Journal; Mobile Apps; Books
- Website: pediatriconcall.com

Pediatric Oncall is a pediatric organization, as well as an online pediatric journal and child health platform. This organization has a large editorial board with experts in various fields of pediatrics as their reviewers. Pediatric Oncall offers free medical advice for both doctors and parents, as well as publishes its own journal called Pediatric Oncall Journal. For practicing physicians, the website serves as a free source of updating themselves. The site is an informative, as well as an interactive platform for doctors and parents offering information on various diseases, vaccines, nutrition, home-made remedies, and even a forum to post one's queries to a doctor.

== History ==
This project was launched through a website by a team of pediatricians from Mumbai in November 2000, with the idea to have a platform where doctors and parents could get consultation and supporting information on all child health-related problems. During the year, Pediatric Oncall formed its own medical advisory board and IT team along with editors to enhance their content and visibility.

In the year 2004 they started with their own indexed journal Pediatric Oncall Journal ISSN 0973-0958. As of March 2014, Pediatric Oncall has recorded an average of 415800 visitors per month according to smarter stats(web analytic tool). The highest traffic is from India followed by the USA and other countries. They started their own conferences known as the Pediatric infectious Diseases Conference from the year 2009. They also initiated projects of HIVinChildren.org and InfectioninChildren.com which are still to be taken on a wider scale.

With the expansion of the internet into mobile technology, they launched their mobile apps in 2013 across iPhone/iPad and android technologies. With easy to use medical calculators, images in clinical practice, drug index, these apps have now been downloaded and installed in Smartphones of pediatricians and medical students worldwide. They revamped their whole website at the start of 2014 to a more user-friendly layout.

== Services ==
=== Website ===
The core medium through which they update their members is their website which is continuously updated with newer articles, case reports, calculators, etc. Being an IT firm, developers are more concentrated on their online website development followed by other services offered by them.

=== Journal ===
Pediatric Oncall Journal is an indexed peer-reviewed medical journal published by Pediatric Oncall since 2004 whose editor-in-chief is Dr. Ira Shah. The journal consists of articles, case reports, spot diagnosis, original articles, teaching files, and more scientific content. It's published online every month but a print issue is circulated every quarter. It's currently indexed in the following: Index Copernicus, Ulrichsweb, Open J-Gate, SafetyLit and Locator Plus. The Journal also has advertisements from pharmaceuticals companies mostly based in India.

=== Mobile Apps ===
Pediatric Oncall's Mobile Applications were launched with the motive of providing its features like medical calculators, drug index, vaccine reminder, etc. to the user's smartphone. These apps are currently available for free in the Google Play store and Apple's App store.

=== Conferences ===
Programs such as Continuing Medical Education (CME) are conducted once or twice in a year by Pediatric Oncall where the latest in the field of pediatrics is discussed. Health Care Professionals in their fields give lectures, panel discussions highlight problems and management of different cases. These are also put online where these videos help other users across the globe. Pediatric Infectious Diseases Conference (PIDC) is a Pediatric Oncall annual conference whose 4th edition was held at Nehru Science Centre, Mumbai, on the 17th Nov, 2014.

=== Health Camps ===
Medical Health camps for children are organized by them in the regions of Girnar and Juna Deesa, Gujarat during the months of October to March. Each location is revisited by the specialist team of doctors for follow-up camps to analyze the progress. Doctor checkup and Medicine distribution form the important aspects of these camps.

== International collaborations ==
Their medical and marketing teams collaborate with international organizations such as World society for Pediatric Infectious Diseases (WSPID), European Society for Paediatric Infectious Diseases (ESPID), EAPS, Asian society of Pediatric Infectious Diseases (ASPID), Excellence In Pediatrics (EiP), etc. for participation in international conference.

== Editorial Board ==
The editorial board and consultants of Pediatric Oncall are key opinion leaders in the field of Pediatrics. There are several reviewers and experts who are part of the Pediatric Oncall community that give their inputs all the time in improvising the website. Dr. Ira Shah [MD, DCH (Gold Medalist), FCPS, DNB, DPID (UK)] is the editor in chief of Pediatric Oncall since its inception. The website has over 180 Reviewers & Experts that handle the online sections and medical queries. The Pediatric Oncall Journal along with the editor-in-chief has a team of managing editor, 10 editorial advisors, student editors and over 30 editorial board members.

== Business Model ==
The revenue of the project is generated by advertising, third-party contributions and sponsorships.
