= Matronae Aufaniae =

Venerated deities

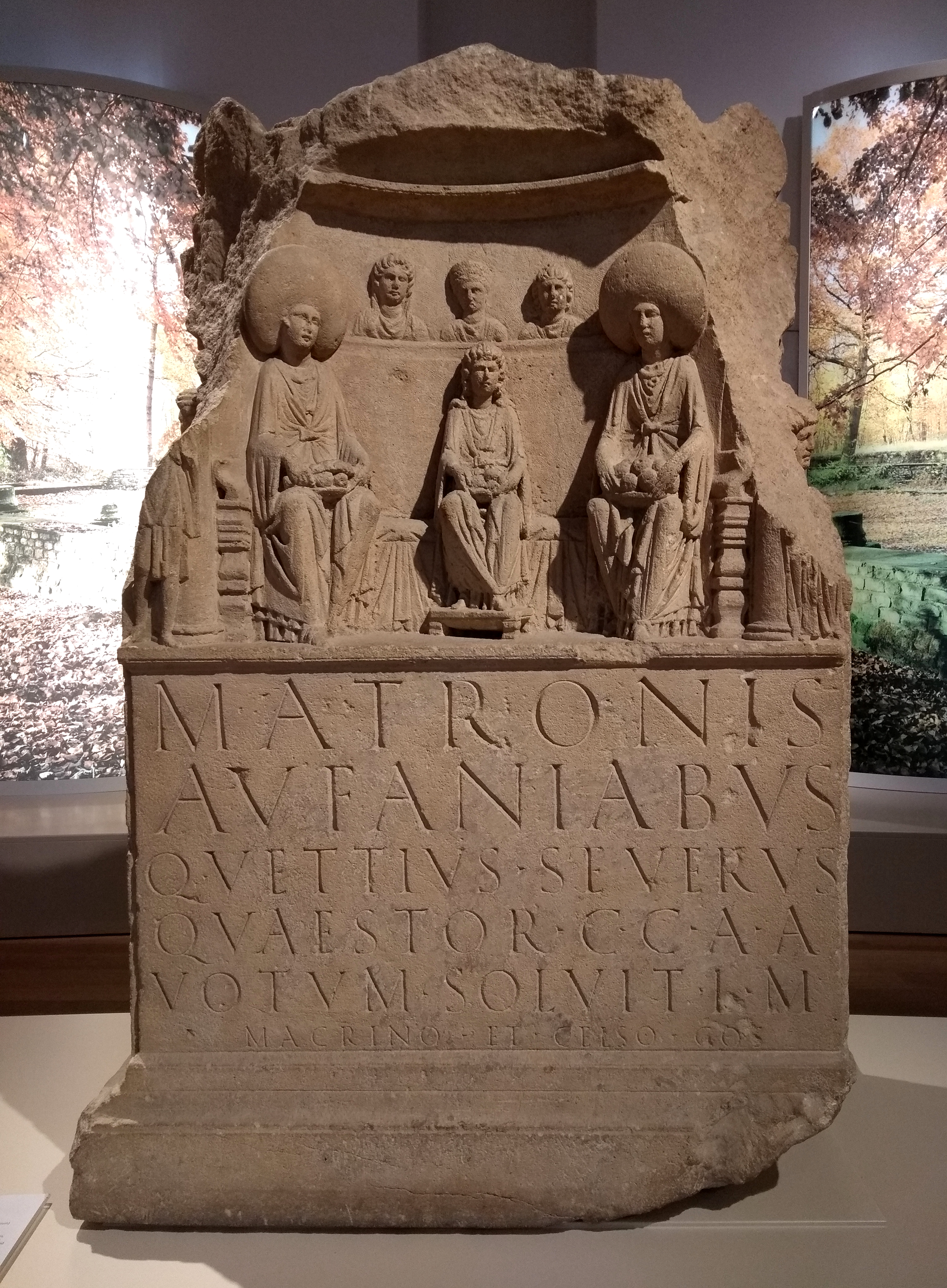
The Aufanian Matronae (detail) from the Gallo-Roman temple site excavated in the Bonn Minster

The Matronae Aufaniae (or Matres Aufaniae or Deae Aufaniae) are Germanic Matronae attested on Roman era altars. The Aufaniae are one of the most frequently recorded names of matronae on record.

Dating to 164-135 CE and consisting of over 90 items, the Aufaniae inscriptions are primarily limited in distribution to the Lower Rhine region in what is today Germany, but a few inscriptions have been found elsewhere: One in Cordoba, Spain, and another in Lyon, France.

The etymology of the name Aufaniae remains unclear. Some scholars propose a link to Gothic ūfjō, meaning 'abundance, plenty'.
