= Swaddling =

Practice of wrapping infants so as to restrict movement

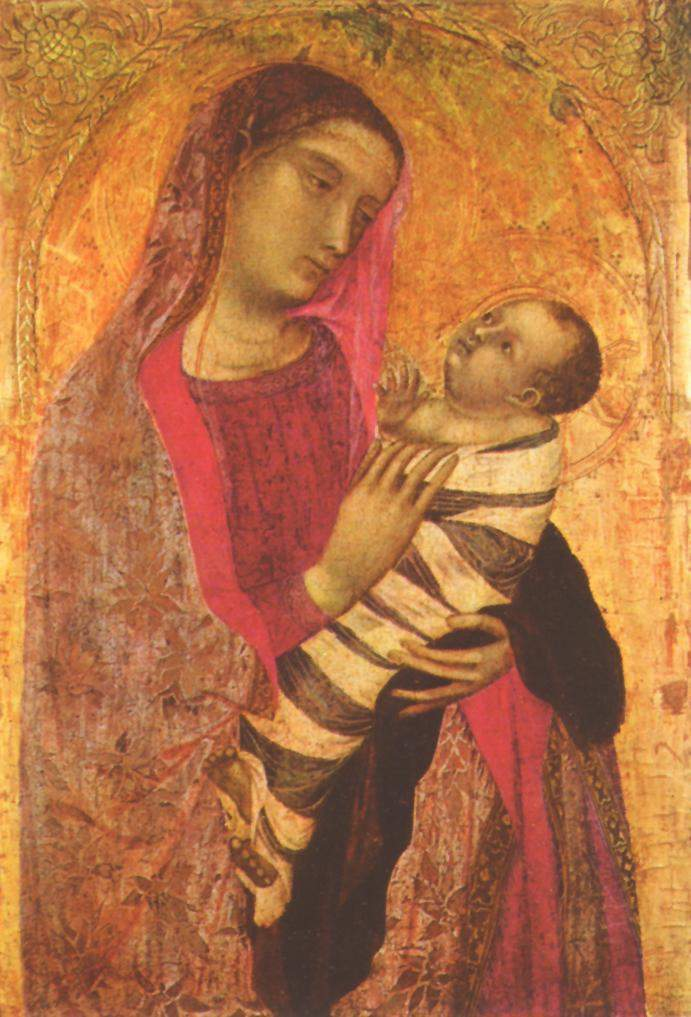
Ambrogio Lorenzetti's Madonna and Child (1319) depicts swaddling bands

Swaddling is an ancient practice of wrapping infants in blankets or similar cloths so that movement of the limbs is tightly restricted. Swaddling bands were often used to further restrict the infant.

A few authors are said to be of the opinion that swaddling is becoming popular again, although medical and psychological opinion on the effects of swaddling is largely against. Some modern medical studies indicate that swaddling helps babies to be relaxed, not get tired due to loss of energy through limb movement, fall asleep, remain asleep, and to be kept in a supine position for lowering the risk of sudden infant death syndrome (SIDS). However, another study indicated that swaddling increased the risk of SIDS. Additionally, emerging evidence is showing that certain swaddling techniques may increase the risk of developmental dysplasia of the hip.

== Origin and history ==
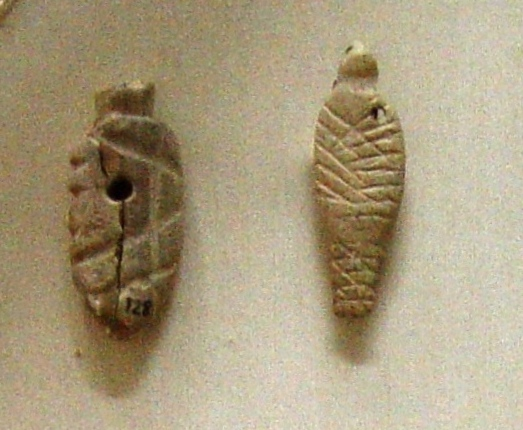
Votive offerings depicting swaddled babies from Agia Triada (Crete), Bronze Age, 2600-2000 BC, Heraklion (Iraklion), Crete. Archeological museum Iraklion

Several authors presume that swaddling was invented in the Paleolithic period. The earliest depictions of swaddled babies are votive offerings and grave goods from Crete and Cyprus, 4000 to 4500 years old.

Votive statuettes have been found in the tombs of Ancient Greek and Roman women who died in childbirth, displaying babies in swaddling clothes. In shrines dedicated to Amphiaraus, models representing babies wrapped in swaddling clothes have been excavated. Apparently, these were frequently given as thank-offerings by anxious mothers when their infants had recovered from sickness.

Probably the most famous record of swaddling is found in the New Testament concerning the birth of Jesus in Luke 2:6–2:7:

And so it was, that, while they were there, the days were accomplished that she should be delivered. And she brought forth her firstborn son, and wrapped him in swaddling clothes and laid him in a manger; because there was no room for them in the inn.

Swaddling clothes described in the Bible consisted of a cloth tied together by bandage-like strips. After an infant was born, the umbilical cord was cut and tied, and then the baby was washed, rubbed with salt and oil, and wrapped with strips of cloth. These strips kept the newborn child warm, and were thought to ensure that the child's limbs would grow straight. Ezekiel 16:4 describes Israel as unswaddled, a metaphor for abandonment.

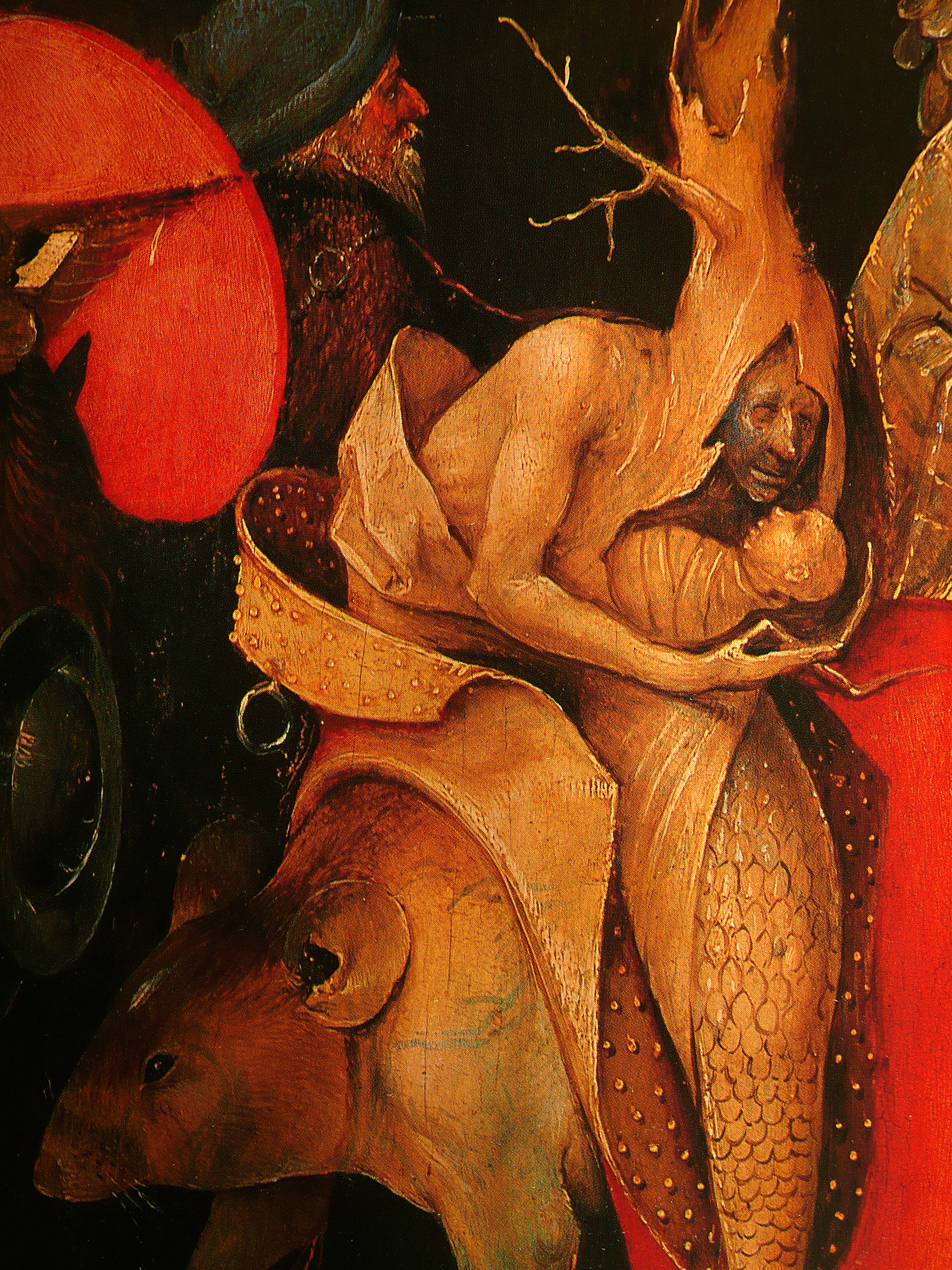
Swaddled baby and bad mother, 1505–1510, detail from The Temptation of St. Anthony by Hieronymus Bosch (c. 1450–1516). Museu Nacional de Arte Antiga, Lisbon

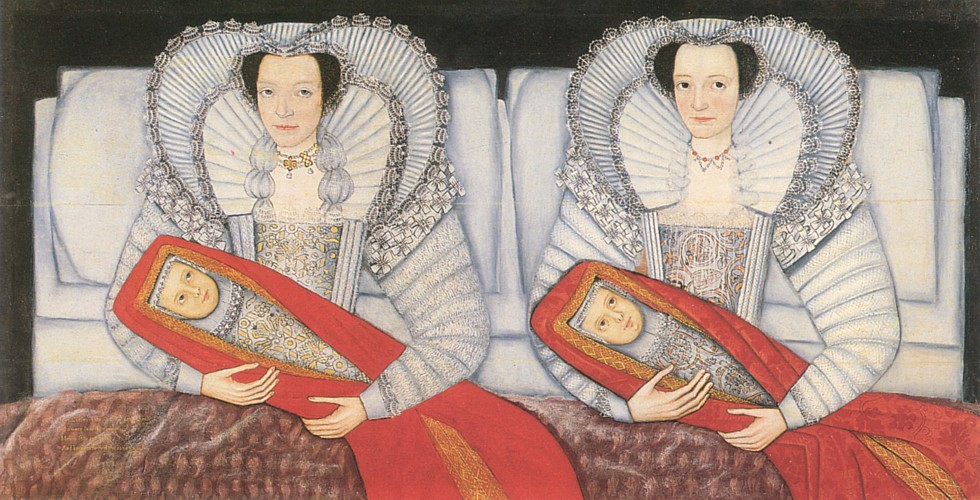
The Cholmondeley Ladies and their swaddled babies. c. 1600–1610

During Tudor times, swaddling involved wrapping the new baby in linen bands from head to foot to ensure the baby would grow up without physical deformity. A stay band would be attached to the forehead and the shoulders to secure the head. Babies would be swaddled like this until about 8 or 9 months.

The Swiss surgeon Felix Würtz (approx. 1500 to approx. 1598) was the first who criticized aspects of swaddling openly.

I also saw right and straight children created by God and born into this world by humans, who became nevertheless bent and lame men, who never got straight and healthy thighs.... In addition, I have for instance let a child lay again down and tied up, so that I see, in which way he was swaddled. There I then really saw, where it was gone wrong.... By misunderstanding however they wanted to bind him straight, but in fact they bind him bent and tighten the bandages hard, so that the child cannot have peace

In the seventeenth century, the scientific opinion towards swaddling began to change. There was an association of neglect with swaddling, especially regarding wetnurses who would leave babies in their care swaddled for long periods without washing or comforting them. More than a hundred years after Würtz, physicians and philosophers from England began to openly criticize swaddling and finally demanded its complete abolishment. The British philosopher John Locke (1632–1704) rejected swaddling in his 1693 publication Some Thoughts Concerning Education, becoming a lobbyist for not binding babies at all. This thought was very controversial during the time, but slowly gained ground, first in England and later elsewhere in Western Europe.

William Cadogan (1711–1797) seems to have been the first physician who pleaded for the complete abolition of swaddling. In his "Essay upon Nursing" of 1748, he expressed his view of contemporary child care, swaddling, the topic of too much clothing for infants and overfeeding. He wrote:

But besides the Mischief arising from the Weight and Heat of these Swaddling-cloaths, they are put on so tight, and the Child is so cramp'd by them, that its Bowels have not room, nor the Limbs any Liberty, to act and exert themselves in the free easy Manner they ought. This is a very hurtful Circumstance, for Limbs that are not used, will never be strong, and such tender Bodies cannot bear much Pressure.

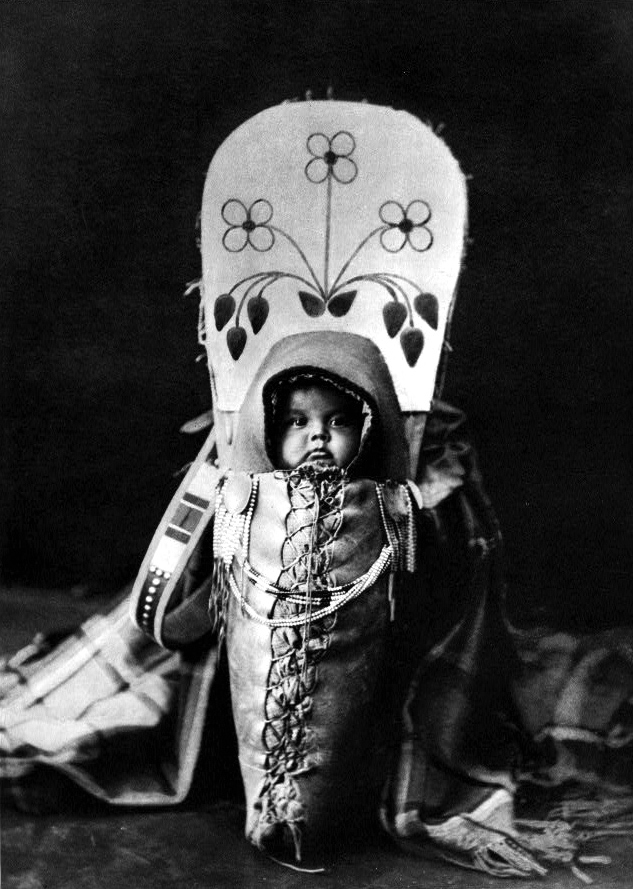
Native American baby of the Nez Perce tribe, 1911

Philosophers and physicians more and more began to reject swaddling in the 18th century. Jean Jacques Rousseau wrote in his book Emile: Or, On Education in 1762:

The child has hardly left the mother's womb, it has hardly begun to move and stretch its limbs, when it is given new bonds. It is wrapped in swaddling bands, laid down with its head fixed, its legs stretched out, and its arms by its sides; it is wound round with linen and bandages of all sorts so that it cannot move […]. Whence comes this unreasonable custom? From an unnatural practice. Since mothers despise their primary duty and do not wish to nurse their own children, they have had to entrust them to mercenary women. These women thus become mothers to a stranger's children, who by nature mean so little to them that they seek only to spare themselves trouble. A child unswaddled would need constant watching; well swaddled it is cast into a corner and its cries are ignored […]. It is claimed that infants left free would assume faulty positions and make movements which might injure the proper development of their limbs. This is one of the vain rationalizations of our false wisdom which experience has never confirmed. Out of the multitude of children who grow up with the full use of their limbs among nations wiser than ourselves, you never find one who hurts himself or maims himself; their movements are too feeble to be dangerous, and when they assume an injurious position, pain warns them to change it.

Although this form of swaddling has fallen out of favour in the Western world, many Eastern cultures and tribal people still use it.

== Modern swaddling ==
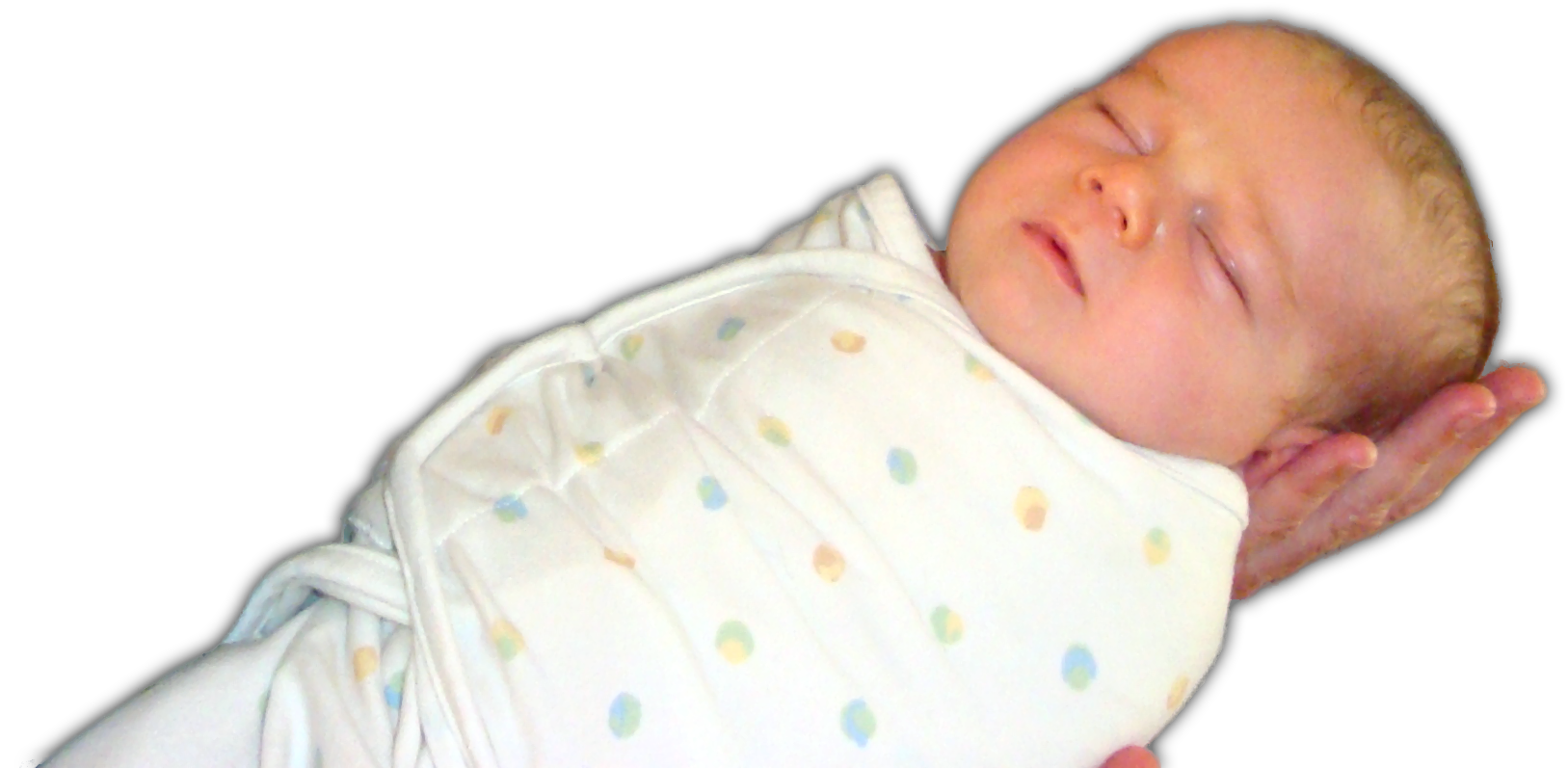
A modern application of swaddling

The swaddling clothes of medieval Madonna and Child paintings are now replaced with cotton receiving blankets, cotton muslin wraps, or specialised "winged" baby swaddles. Modern swaddling is becoming increasingly popular today as a means of settling and soothing irritable infants and helping babies sleep longer with fewer awakenings. Since the early 1990s, the medical community has recommended placing babies on their back to sleep to reduce the risk of SIDS. As studies proved swaddled babies sleep better in the back sleeping position, swaddling has become increasingly popular and recommended so parents avoid the dangerous stomach sleeping position. Swaddling also prevents newborns waking themselves with their Moro reflex.

Loose and ineffective swaddling techniques made while using an undersized blanket can generally be kicked off by a wakeful baby. It is important for caregivers to accomplish a secure swaddle to ensure the blanket does not become loose and the baby remains wrapped during the sleep period. The act of swaddling does carry a risk of the baby overheating if the caregiver uses multiple blankets that are too thick or uses thick fluffy fabric that creates excessive thermal insulation.

Modern specialized baby swaddles are designed to make it easier to swaddle a baby than with traditional square blanket. They are typically fabric blankets in a triangle, 'T' or 'Y' shape, with 'wings' that fold around the baby's torso or down over the baby's shoulders and around underneath the infant. Some of these products employ Velcro patches or other fasteners. Some parents prefer a specialized device because of the relative ease of use, and many parents prefer a large square receiving blanket or wrap because they can get a tighter and custom fit and the baby will not outgrow the blanket.

To avoid hip dysplasia risk, the swaddle should be done in such a way that the baby is able to move his or her legs freely at the hip. This is more easily done with a large blanket that can keep the arms in place while allowing the legs flexibility, all while allowing for proper hip development.

By the time the baby is learning to roll over, often around 4–5 months, parents and caregivers should transition the baby from swaddling to a less restrictive covering for sleep. If the baby can roll over, then it is important for the baby to have use of its hands and arms to adjust his or her head position after rolling over. The traditional swaddling uses flat strings for babies to be tied; care is needed not to tie them too hard or blood flow would be restricted. The American Academy of Pediatrics advises stopping swaddling as soon as a baby shows any signs of trying to roll over, which some babies begin as early as two months of age.

=== Regional variations ===
Swaddling is still practiced worldwide. In some countries, swaddling is the standard treatment of babies. In Turkey, for instance, 93.1% of all babies become swaddled in the traditional way. According to the Human Relations Area Files (HRAF), 39% of all documented contemporary non-industrialized cultures show swaddling practices; further 19% use other methods of movement restriction for infants. Some authors assume that the popularity of swaddling is growing in the U.S., Great Britain and the Netherlands. A British sample showed up 19.4% of the babies are swaddled at night. In Germany, swaddling is not used as routine care measure. For example, the standard work on regulatory disturbances by Papusek does not mention swaddling at all.

=== Medical uses ===
Swaddling as a medical intervention with a clearly limited indication range is used in the care practices of premature babies. Also swaddling is used for reducing pain in such care actions as collecting blood at the heel. The swaddling of these premature babies (very low birth weight infants) takes place only very loosely. It is meant to hold the weak arms at the body and make certain movements possible. This "swaddling" is something completely different from traditional swaddling in the stretched position.

== Psychological and physiological effects ==
Modern medical studies of swaddling use a form that is considerably shorter and less severe than the historical forms. The classical study by Lipton et al. of 1965 dealt with a modern swaddling form. The researchers described the two main effects of tightly wrapping babies: they are motorically calm and sleep much. These effects are detected by means of various psycho-physiological parameters, such as heart rate, sleep duration and duration of crying. The research group around the Dutch biologist van Sleuwen in 2007 confirms this picture in their latest meta-analysis of medical studies on swaddling and its effects.

However, severe restrictions on the scope of these studies should be kept in mind, because most of the positive effects mentioned by van Sleuwen et al. are not related to normally developed newborns, but to impaired babies, namely premature babies and babies with detectable organic brain damage. Swaddling enhances the REM sleep (active sleep) and also the whole sleep duration. The effect of swaddling on the regulatory disturbance excessive crying is not very convincing: By adding the swaddling there is an immediate "calming" effect on children, but after a few days the effect of the introduction of regularity with swaddling is exactly the same as the regularity on its own. In other words: after a few days swaddling is completely unnecessary. It is therefore contraindicated to address the potential risk of swaddling, because the effect is only for a short term available, but after a little while is negligible.

=== Motor development ===
Two studies based on indigenous peoples of the Americas did not show a delay in the onset of walking caused by the restraint of the use of the cradleboard. In other areas of the motor development, clear delays of the development show up even when mild restrictions take place. A Japanese study concluded that the application of the basket cradle (ejiko) leads to a delayed onset of walking. An older Austrian study showed that swaddled Albanian babies showed a delayed ability to crawl and reach things with their hands. This shows the need for further substantial scientific clarifying regarding the impairment of motor skills by swaddling.

=== Sudden infant death syndrome ===
The effects of swaddling on the sudden infant death syndrome (SIDS) are unclear. A 2016 review found tentative evidence that swaddling increases risk of SIDS, especially among babies placed on their stomachs or side while sleeping.

Swaddling was supposed to keep babies on their back, in order to prevent SIDS. Swaddling itself is not seen as a protective factor for SIDS. Swaddling may even increase the risk when babies sleep in the prone position; it reduces the risk if they sleep in the supine position. A recent study demonstrated now, that swaddling is apparently a risk factor for SIDS, although the opposite was often previously assumed: Of the babies who died of SIDS, 24% were swaddled; in the control-groups only 6% were swaddled.

=== Documented negative effects ===
Several empirical studies show evidence of negative effects of swaddling.

- Swaddling, especially traditional forms, increases the risk for hip dysplasia.
- Tight swaddling, particularly where the head is covered, reduces the baby's ability to cool its body temperature which can lead to hyperthermia. In one case, a heavily wrapped child died of hyperthermia.
- In one study, the risk of developing respiratory infections increased fourfold by swaddling.
- A pediatrician found in his sample the flattening of the occipital aspect of the head of babies, who were wrapped tightly and lay in their traditional cradles.
- Tight chest wrapping or swaddling has been associated with an increased risk of pneumonia. Traditional tight swaddling simulates a strait jacket and prevents baby from moving their arms to self-settle.
- In the most important contemporary study on swaddling practices in maternity wards by Bystrova et al., it is shown that swaddling in the hours after birth is linked with delayed recovery from post-natal weight loss. A positive effect on the recovery is given by direct skin-to-skin contact between mother and baby in the hours after birth. Skin-to-skin contact was shown to reduce the impact of the stress of being born, with babies maintaining their body temperature to a greater degree than those swaddled in a nursery.
- Another study by Bystrova also indicates that maternal behavior develops less under swaddling conditions, and reciprocity within the mother-child dyad is reduced.

== See also ==
- Babywearing
- Childbirth
- Infant massage
- Infant's binder
- Kangaroo care
- Psychohistory
- Sleeping bag (infant)
- Swaddled infant votive

== Notes ==
=== References ===
- Adolph, Karen E.; Karasik (Vishnevetsky), Lana B.; Tamis-LeMonda, Catherine S. (2010). Moving Between Cultures: Cross-Cultural Research on Motor Development. In: Marc H. Bornstein (Hg.). Handbook of cross-cultural developmental science, Vol. 1, Domains of development across cultures. New York. (pp. 61–88)
- Akman, Alp; Korkmaz, Ayşe; Aksoy, M. Cemalettin; Yazici, Muharrem; Yurdakök, Murat, Tekinalp, Gülsevin (2007). Evaluation of risk factors in developmental dysplasia of the hip: results of infantile hip ultrasonography. In: The Turkish Journal of Pediatrics, 49, pp. 290–294.
- Bacon, C. J.; Bell, S. A.; Clulow, E E; Beattie, A. B. (1991). How mothers keep their babies warm. Archives of Disease in Childhood, 66, pp. 627–632.
- Blair, Peter S.; Sidebotham, Peter; Evason-Coombe, Carol; Edmonds, Margaret; Fleming, Peter. (2009). Hazardous cosleeping environments and risk factors amenable to change: case-control study of SIDS in south west England. British Medical Journal, 339, b3666.
- BMJ 2009;339:b3666 doi:10.1136/bmj.b3666 yo
- Bloch, Aaron (1966). The Kurdistani Cradle Story: A Modern Analysis of This Centuries-Old Infant Swaddling Practice. In: Clinical Pediatrics, 5, 641–645.
- Bromiley, Geoffrey W. (1995). "Swaddling". The International Standard Bible Encyclopedia (reprint, revised ed.). Wm. B. Eerdmans Publishing Co. pp. 670. ISBN 978-0-8028-3784-4. books.google.com Retrieved 12/15/2009.
- Bystrova, Ksenia; Widström, Ann-Marie; Matthiesen, Ann-Sofi; Ransjö-Arvidson, Anna-Berit; Welles-Nyström; Barbara, Vorontsov, Igor; Uvnäs-Moberg, Kerstin (2003). Skin-to-skin contact may reduce negative consequences of "the stress of being born": a study on temperature in newborn infants, subjected to different ward routines in St. Petersburg. In: Acta Pædiatr, 92, pp. 320–326.
- Bystrova, Ksenia; Widström, Ann-Marie; Matthiesen, Ann-Sofi; Ransjö-Arvidson, Anna-Berit; Welles-Nyström; Barbara, Vorontsov, Igor; Uvnäs-Moberg, Kerstin (2007 a). The effect of Russian Maternity Home routines on breastfeeding and neonatal weight loss with special reference to swaddling. In: Early Human Development, 83, pp. 29–39.
- Bystrova, Ksenia; Widström, Ann-Marie; Matthiesen, Ann-Sofi; Ransjö-Arvidson, Anna-Berit; Welles-Nyström; Barbara, Vorontsov, Igor; Uvnäs-Moberg, Kerstin (2007 b). Early lactation performance in primiparous and multiparous women in relation to different maternity home practices. A randomised trial in St. Petersburg. In: International Breastfeeding Journal, 2, pp. 9-23.
- Bystrova, Ksenia (2008). Skin-to-skin contact and early suckling in the postpartum: effects on temperature, feeding and mother-infant interaction. Stockholm.
- Cadogan, William (1748). An essay upon nursing and the management of children from their birth to three years of age. London.
- Caglayan, Suat; Yaprak, Isin; Seçkin, Ebru; Kansoy, Savas; Aydinlioglu Halil (1991). A different approach to sleep problems of infancy: swaddling above the waist. In: The Turkish Journal of Pediatrics, 33, pp. 117–120.
- Chaarani, M.W.; Al Mahmeid, M.S.; Salman, A.M. (2002). Developmental dysplasia of the hip before and after increasing community awareness of the harmful effects of swaddling. In: Qatar Medical Journal, 11 (1), pp. 40–43.
- Cheng, Tina L.; Partridge, J. Colin (1993). Effect of Bundling and High Environmental Temperature on Neonatal Body Temperature. In: Pediatrics, 92, pp. 238–240.
- Chisholm, James S. (1983). Navajo infancy: an ethological study of child development. New York.
- Danzinger, Lotte, Frankl, Liselotte (1934). Zum Problem der Funktionsreifung: erster Bericht über Entwicklungsprüfungen an albanischen Kindern. In: Zeitschrift für Kinderforschung, 43, pp. 219–254.
- DeMause, Lloyd (2002). The Emotional Life of Nations. Other Press. p. 322. ISBN 978-1-892746-98-6.
- DeMeo, James (2006). Saharasia: The 4000 BCE Origins of Child Abuse, Sex-Repression, Warfare and Social Violence, In the Deserts of the Old World (Revised Second ed.). Natural Energy Works. ISBN 978-0-9621855-5-7.
- Dennis, Wayne (1940 a). Infant Reaction to Restraint: An Evaluation of Watson's Theory. In: Transactions of the New York Academy of Sciences, 2 (2), pp. 202–219.
- Dennis, Wayne (1940 b). The Hopi Child. New York.
- Fearon, Isabel; Kisilevsky, Barbara; Mains, Sylvia; Muir, Darwin W.; Tranmer, Joan. (1997). Swaddling After Heel Lance: Age-Specific Effects on Behavioral Recovery in Preterm Infants. In: Journal of Developmental and Behavioral Pediatrics, 18 (4), pp. 222–232.
- Franco, Patricia; Seret, Nicole; van Hees, Jean-Noël; Scaillet, Sonia; Groswasser, José; Kahn, André (2005). Influence of Swaddling on Sleep and Arousal Characteristics of Healthy Infants: Pediatrics, 115, 1307–1311.
- Frenken, Ralph (2011 a). Gefesselte Kinder: Geschichte und Psychologie des Wickelns. Wissenschaftlicher Verlag Bachmann. Badenweiler.
- Frenken, Ralph (2011 b). Psychology and history of swaddling: Part two – The abolishment of swaddling from the 16th century until today. In: The Journal of Psychohistory, 39 (3), p. 219-245.
- Gerard, Claudia, Harris, Kathleen A., Thach, Bradley T., (2002 a). Spontaneous Arousals in Supine Infants While Swaddled and Unswaddled During Rapid Eye Movement and Quiet Sleep: Pediatrics, 110, pp. e70-e77
- Gerard, C. M.; Harris, K. A.; Thach, B. T. (2002). "Spontaneous Arousals in Supine Infants While Swaddled and Unswaddled During Rapid Eye Movement and Quiet Sleep". Pediatrics. 110 (6) e70. doi:10.1542/peds.110.6.e70. PMID 12456937.
- Gerard, Claudia M.; Harris Kathleen A., Thach, Bradley T. (2002 b). Physiologic studies on swaddling: An ancient child care practice, which may promote the supine position for infant sleep. Journal of Pediatrics, 141, pp. 398–404.
- Gilbert, R., Rudd, P; Berry, P. J.: Fleming, P. J.; Hall, E.; White, D. G.; Oreffo, V. O., James, P.; Evans, J. A. (1992). Combined effect of infection and heavy wrapping on the risk of sudden unexpectedinfant death. In: Archives of Disease in Childhood, 67, pp. 171–177.
- Gilbert, R. (1994). The changing epidemiology of SIDS. In: Archives of Disease in Childhood, 70, pp. 445–449.
- Kennell, J. H.; McGrath, S.K. (2003). Beneficial effects of skin-to-skin contact. In: Acta Paediatrica, 92, pp. 272–273.
- Kremli, Mamoun K.; Alshahid, Ahmed H.; Khoshhal, Khalid I.; Zamzam, Mohammed M. (2003). The pattern of developmental dysplasia of the hip: In: Saudi Medical Journal, 24 (10), pp. 1118–1120.
- Kutlu, Abdurrahman; Memik, Recep; Mutlu, Mahmut; Kutlu, Ruhusen; Arslan, Ahmet (1992). Congenital Dislocation of the Hip and Its Relation to Swaddling Used in Turkey. In: Journal of Pediatric Orthopaedics, 12, pp. 598–602.
- Lipton, Earle L., Steinschneider, Alfred, Richmond, Julius B. (1965). Swaddling, a Child Care Practice: Historical, Cultural, and Experimental Observations: Pediatrics, 35, pp. 521–567.
- Long, Tony (2007). Adding swaddling to behaviour modification in infant care did not reduce excessive crying in healthy infants <13 weeks of age at randomisation. Evidence Based Nursing,10, p. 42.
- Long, T. (2007). "Adding swaddling to behaviour modification in infant care did not reduce excessive crying in healthy infants <13 weeks of age at randomisation". Evidence-Based Nursing. 10 (2): 42. doi:10.1136/ebn.10.2.42. PMID 17384094. S2CID 32511252.
- McNamara, F.; Lijowska, A. S.; Thach, B. T. (2002). "Spontaneous arousal activity in infants during NREM and REM sleep". The Journal of Physiology. 538 (Pt 1): 263–9. doi:10.1113/jphysiol.2001.012507. PMC 2290006. PMID 11773333.
- Mafart, B.; Kéfi, R.; Béraud-Colomb, E. (2007). Palaeopathological and Palaeogenetic Study of 13 Cases of Developmental Dysplasia of the Hip with Dislocation in a Historical Population from Southern France. In: International Journal of Osteoarchaeology, 17, pp. 26–38.
- Mahan, Susan T.; Kasser, James R., (2008). Does Swaddling Influence Developmental Dysplasia of the Hip? Pediatrics, 121, pp. 177–178.
- Meyer, L. E.; Erler, T. (2009). Schlafqualität bei Säuglingen: Polysomnographisch gestützter Vergleich unter Wickel-(Swaddling-) Bedingungen. In: Somnologie, 13, pp. 24–28.
- Nelson, Edmund Anthony Severn; Schiefenhoevel, Wulf; Haimerl, Felizitas (2000). Child Care Practices in Nonindustrialized Societies. In: Pediatrics, 105, p. e75.
- Odent, Michel (12/23/2007). "The Future of Suicide". Birth Works, Inc. birthpsychology.com Retrieved 12/15/2009.
- Papousek, Mechthild; Schieche, Michael; Wurmser, Harald (Eds.) (2004) Regulationsstörungen der frühen Kindheit. Frühe Risiken und Hilfen im Entwicklungskontext der Eltern-Kind-Beziehungen. Bern.
- Richardson, Heidi L.; Walker, Adrian M.; Horne, Rosemary (2009). Minimizing the Risks of Sudden Infant Death Syndrome: To Swaddle or Not to Swaddle? In: The Journal of Pediatrics, 155, 475–481.
- Short, Mary A.; Brooks-Brunn, Jo Ann, Reves, Deborah S.; Yeager, Janet, Thorpe, Jean Ann (1996) The Effects of Swaddling Versus Standard Positioning on Neuromuscular Development in Very Low Birth Weight Infants. In: Neonatal Network, 15 (4). pp. 25–31.
- Sim, Alison (1998). The Tudor Housewife. McGill-Queen's Press. pp. 26. ISBN 978-0-7509-3774-0.
- Task Force on Infant Sleep Position and Sudden Infant Death Syndrome (2000). Changing concepts of Sudden Infant Death Syndrome: Implications for infant sleeping environment and sleep position. In: Pediatrics, 105 (3), pp. 650–656.
- Thach, Bradley T. (2009). Does Swaddling Decrease or Increase the Risk for Sudden Infant Death Syndrome? In: The Journal of Pediatrics, 155, pp. 461–462.
- Thompson, Charles John S. (March 1922). "Greco-Roman votive offerings for health in the Wellcome Historical Medical Museum". Health (Wellcome Library, London, UK: Hazell, Watson and Viney).
- Archives.wellcome.ac.uk
- Van Gestel, Josephus Petrus Johannes, L'Hoir, Monique Pauline, ten Berge, Maartje, Jansen, Nicolaas Johannes Georgius, Plötz, Frans Berend (2002). Risks of Ancient Practices in Modern Times. In: Pediatrics, 110, pp. 78–88.
- Van Sleuwen, B. E.; L'Hoir, M. P.; Engelberts, A. C.; Westers, P.; Schulpen, T. W. J. (2003). Infant care practices related to cot death in Turkish and Moroccan families in the Netherlands. In: Archives of Disease in Childhood, 88, pp. 784–788.
- Van Sleuwen, B. E., L'Hoir, M. P.; Engelberts, A. C.; Busschers, W. B.; Westers, P.; Blom, M. A. et al. (2006). Comparison of behavior modification with and without swaddling as interventions for excessive crying. In: Journal of Pediatrics, 149 (4), pp. 512–517.
- Van Sleuwen, Bregje E.; Engelberts, Adèle C.; Boere-Boonekamp, Magda M.; Kuis, Wietse, Schulpen, Tom W.J.; L'Hoir, Monique P. (2007). Swaddling: A Systematic Review. In: Pediatrics, 120, pp. e1097-e1106.
- Würtz, Felix (1612). Kinderbüchlein. In: Felix Würtz. Wund-Artzney. Basel. p. 674-730. (First edition 1612, printed 1675): Felix Wuertzen / Weiland des berühmten Wundarztes zu Basel Wund-Artzney / darinnen allerhand schädliche Missbräuche (...).
- Young Holliday, Diane (2005). Occipital lesions: A possible cost of cradleboards. In: American Journal of Physical Anthropology, 90 (3), pp. 283–290.
- Yurdakok, Kadrye; Yavuz, Tuna; Taylor, Carl E. (1990). Swaddling and Acute Respiratory Infections. In: American Journal of Public Health, 80 (7), pp. 873–875.
