= Vertillum =

Gallo-Roman site in France

- Location in France
- 47.918887°N 4.346037°E
- Type: Gallo-Roman settlement
- Location: Vertault
- Region: Côte-d'Or, France

Site notes
- Height: 355 metres (1,165 ft)

Vertillum is a Gallo-Roman site in the modern commune of Vertault in the Côte-d'Or department of eastern France. It has been extensively (and often destructively) excavated over the past century. Many of the objects found at the site are held in the nearby Musée du Pays Châtillonnais.

Vertillum was classified as a Historical Monument in 1875. It includes many buried structures, remains of ramparts, thermal baths and a temple. A Gallic oppidum covering about 25 hectares (62 acres) originally occupied the site, surrounded by a stone wall and ditch. Later it evolved into a Gallo-Roman settlement with the typical features of such cities: residential areas, a forum, baths, temple and administrative center. The Roman town would have had between 3,000 and 5,000 inhabitants. Excavations in the 19th and early 20th centuries were extremely destructive. Formerly well-preserved buildings, particularly the baths, were destroyed.

Vertillum was a center for working copper-based alloys. Unfinished objects and waste material show that the smiths used foundry techniques to work sheet iron and to bronze the iron objects. These include handles, dishes and keys, some ornate and some simple. The archaeological setting of the older discoveries was not recorded, so it is not possible to define a chronology of metal working at the site.

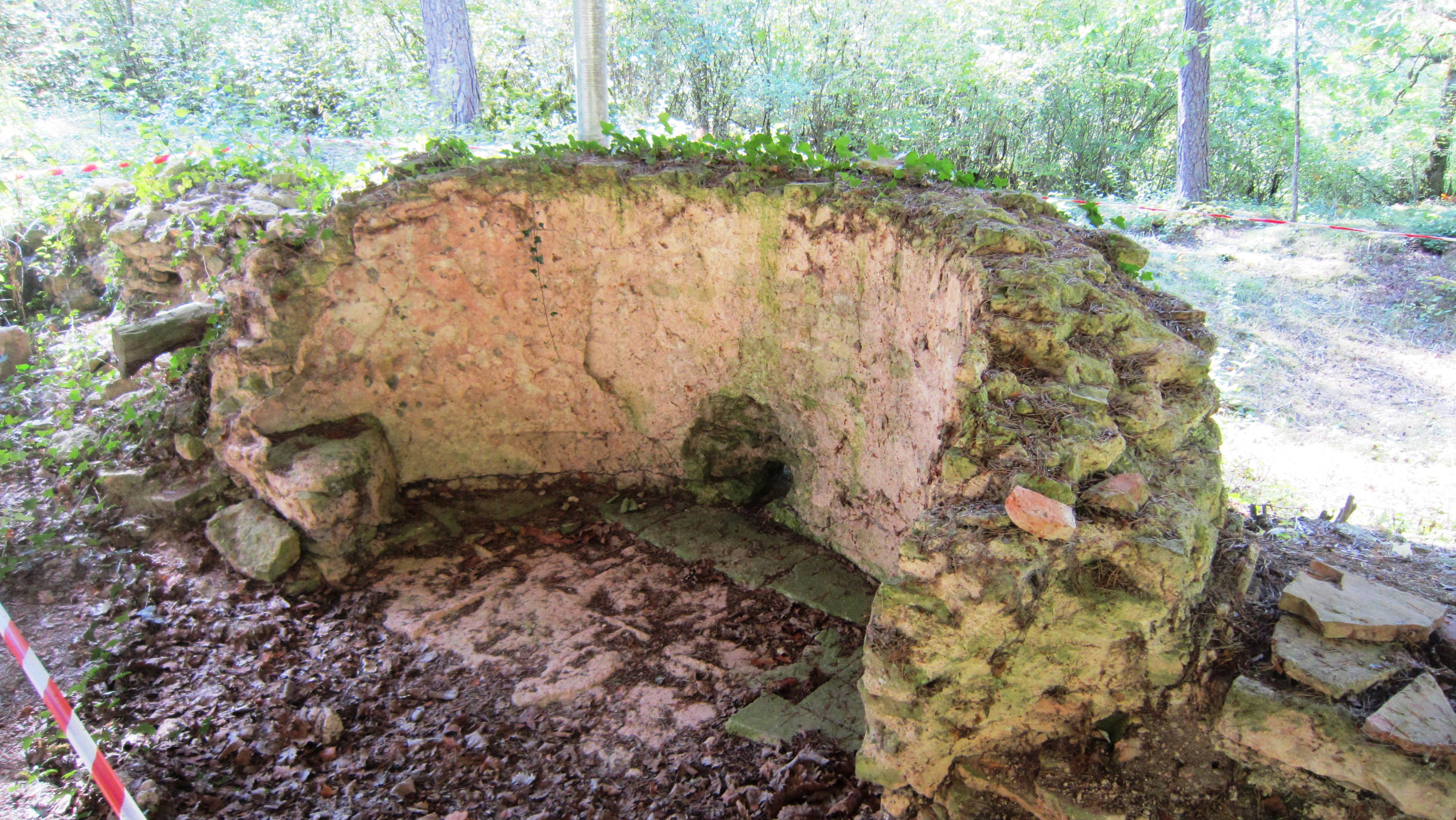
Remains of the thermae, 2015.

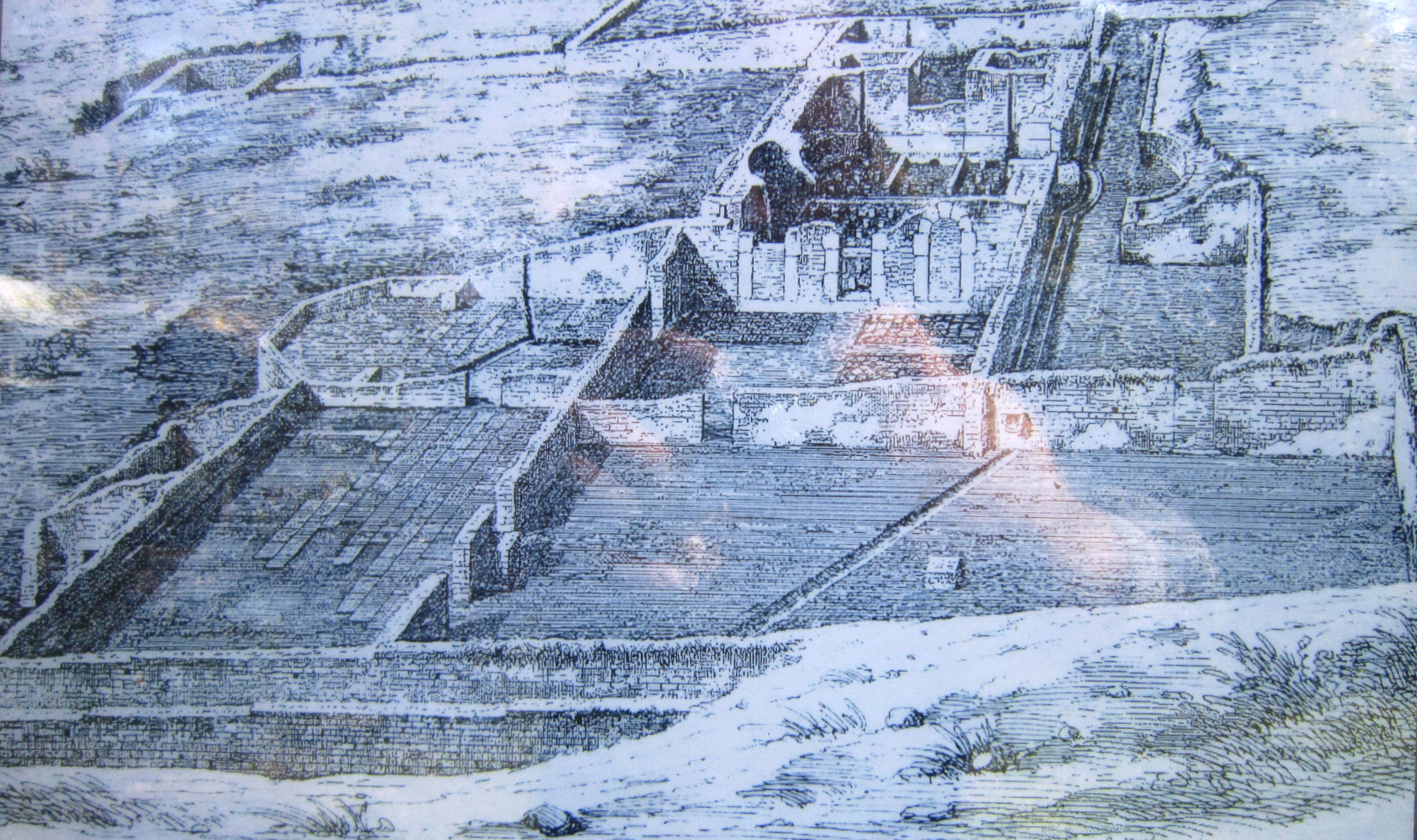
Vertillum during the 19th century.

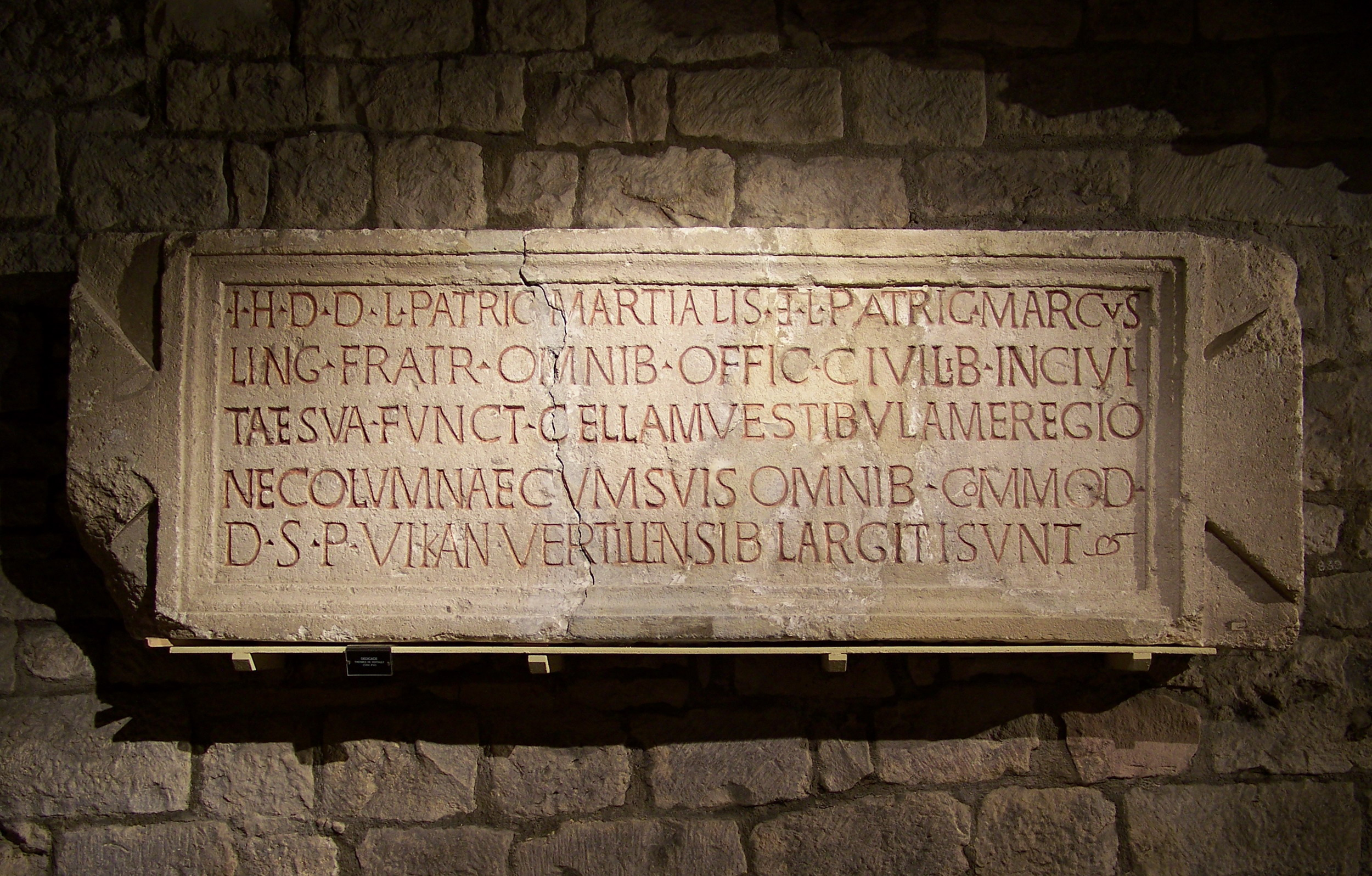
Roman inscription of the thermal baths, kept in musée archéologique de Dijon.

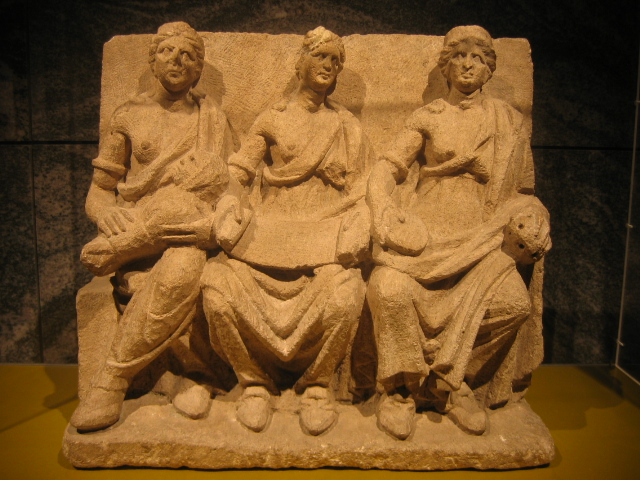
Vertault relief.

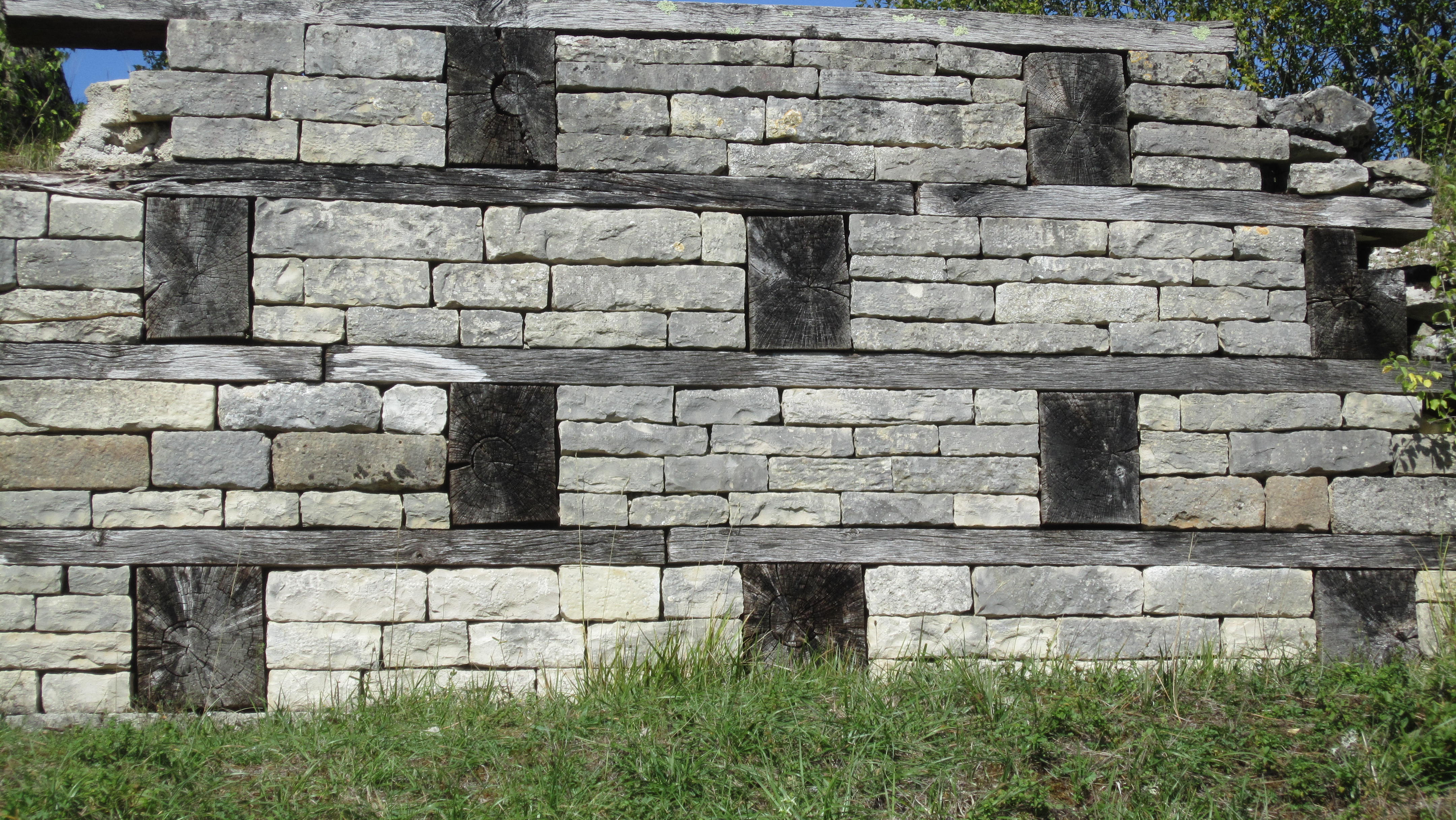
Reconstruction of a murus gallicus.
