= Tamar Schapiro =

American philosopher

- Born: Chicago, Illinois, U.S.

Education
- Education: Yale University (BA); Harvard University (PhD)

Philosophical work
- Era: 21st-century philosophy
- Region: Western philosophy
- School: Kantian philosophy
- Institutions: Massachusetts Institute of Technology (Associate Professor 2016-2021; Professor 2021–present); Stanford University (2000–2015)
- Main interests: Ethics; moral psychology; practical reason; history of ethics
- Notable works: Feeling Like It: A Theory of Inclination and Will (2021)

Tamar Schapiro is an American philosopher whose work focuses on ethical theory, moral psychology, practical reason, and the history of modern moral philosophy, especially the thought of Immanuel Kant. She is Professor of Philosophy at the Massachusetts Institute of Technology (MIT). Her book Feeling Like It: A Theory of Inclination and Will (2021) offers a Kantian account of the role of inclination in human agency.

== Early life and education ==
Schapiro was raised in the south suburbs of Chicago in a Jewish family that had fled Nazi Europe. She earned a B.A. in philosophy summa cum laude from Yale University in 1986, receiving the Tuttle Cup for highest scholastic achievement. She completed her Ph.D. in philosophy at Harvard University in 1997, where she began her intensive study of Kant's ethics.

== Academic career ==
From 1997 to 2000 Schapiro was a Junior Fellow of the Harvard Society of Fellows. She joined the Stanford University Department of Philosophy in 2000, was promoted to associate professor with tenure in 2009, and remained until 2015. During her Stanford years she held fellowships from the Stanford Humanities Center (2003–04) and the Hellman Fellows Fund (2005–06). In 2011–12 she was a Fellow of Harvard's Radcliffe Institute for Advanced Study, where she worked on the moral psychology of inclination. Schapiro moved to MIT in 2015 as a visiting associate professor, became associate professor in 2016, and was promoted to full professor in 2021.

== Philosophical work ==
Schapiro's research investigates how universal principles of rational morality can be reconciled with the non-rational aspects of human nature. Her early article "What Is a Child?" (1999) analyzes the moral status of children and the limits of paternalism. Since the mid-2000s she has focused on Kantian moral psychology. In Feeling Like It she argues that inclinations "incline without necessitating" the will, offering a unified account of self-control that has been discussed in MIND, Ethics, and other journals.

== Reception ==
Feeling Like It received in-depth reviews in several leading, independent journals. Richard Holton described it as "stimulating" and praised Schapiro's analysis of inclination and agency in Mind. Nomy Arpaly lauded the book's clarity in reconciling rational and nonrational motives in Ethics. Carla Bagnoli called it a "much anticipated book" in Analysis. Shahriar Khosravi highlighted its contribution to Kantian moral psychology in Philosophy in Review. Francey Russell termed it a "terrific book" centralizing inclination in agency in the Philosophical Review. Sergio Tenenbaum commended its nuanced articulation of a Kant-inspired moral psychological view in the Australasian Journal of Philosophy. Amy Levine praised its accessibility for graduate students in the Journal of Moral Philosophy.

== Public engagement ==
Schapiro has appeared as a guest on the radio program Philosophy Talk, discussing the moral status of children and paternalism. She also appeared on the Plato's Cave podcast, speaking on weak-willed action from a Kantian perspective.

== Selected publications ==
- (ed. with Kyla Ebels-Duggan and Sharon Street) Normativity and Agency: Themes from the Philosophy of Christine M. Korsgaard. Oxford University Press, 2022.
- Feeling Like It: A Theory of Inclination and Will. Oxford University Press, 2021.
- "Animal Nature Within and Without: A Comment on Korsgaard's Fellow Creatures." *Philosophy and Phenomenological Research* 105 (1): 230-235 (2022).
- "Imperatives," in Steven M. Cahn (ed.), Understanding Kant's Groundwork. Hackett Publishing Company, May 2023.
- "What Is a Child?" *Ethics* 109 (4): 715-738 (1999).
- "Childhood and Personhood." *Arizona Law Review* 45 (3): 575-594 (2003).
- "The Nature of Inclination." *Ethics* 119 (2): 229-256 (2009).
- "Desire," in *International Encyclopedia of Ethics* (2013).

== Honors and fellowships ==
- Junior Fellow, Harvard Society of Fellows (1997–2000).
- Whiting Foundation Fellowship in the Humanities (1996–97).
- Mellon Foundation Fellowship in the Humanities (1998).
- Hellman Junior Faculty Fellowship, Stanford University (2005–06).
- Fellow, Radcliffe Institute for Advanced Study (2011–12).
- Emily and Charles Carrier Prize, Harvard University (1997).
- Chair, MIT Committee on Discipline (2023–present).

== Professional service ==
Schapiro serves on the editorial boards of *Ethics* and the *Journal of Ethics and Social Philosophy*. She has also participated in public discussions of ethics, including a Stanford Law School panel on the value of teaching ethics.

== Teaching ==
At MIT and previously at Stanford, Schapiro has taught courses on the philosophy of agency, Kant's ethical theory, modern moral philosophy, and recent ethical theory.

== Personal life ==
Schapiro is married to a theatre director based in Boston.
