= Heinrich von Louffenburg =

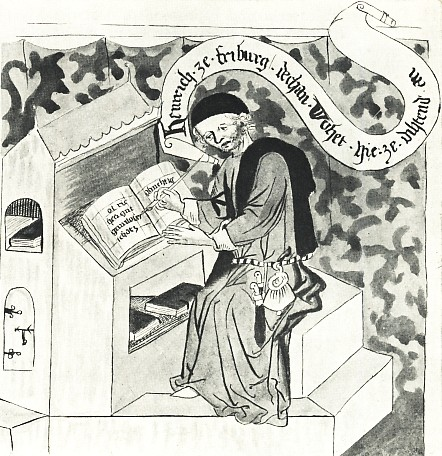
Heinrich von Laufenberg

Heinrich von Louffenburg (1391–1460) was a Swabian priest born at Louffenburg on the Rhein, Germany.

He is best known for his treatise, Versehung des Leibs (Care of the Body), written in 1429. It was published in 1491 as one of four great medical treatises in Pediatric Incunabula, the first known text to be devoted to the normal physiology and common illnesses of children. Louffenburg wrote his treatise in Swabian, his native tongue, instead of the traditional Latin. It is a poem meant to be chanted, as that is how works were often written to aid memorization and the spread of information among those who were not able to read and write.

Later in life, Louffenburg was a dean of St. Mauritius in Zofingen. In 1445, he entered the Benedictine monastery Saint John Abbey in Müstair, Switzerland. He spent his later years translating church poems from Latin into Swabian. He died on 31 March 1460 at the Abbey.
