= Aveta =

Gaulish goddess

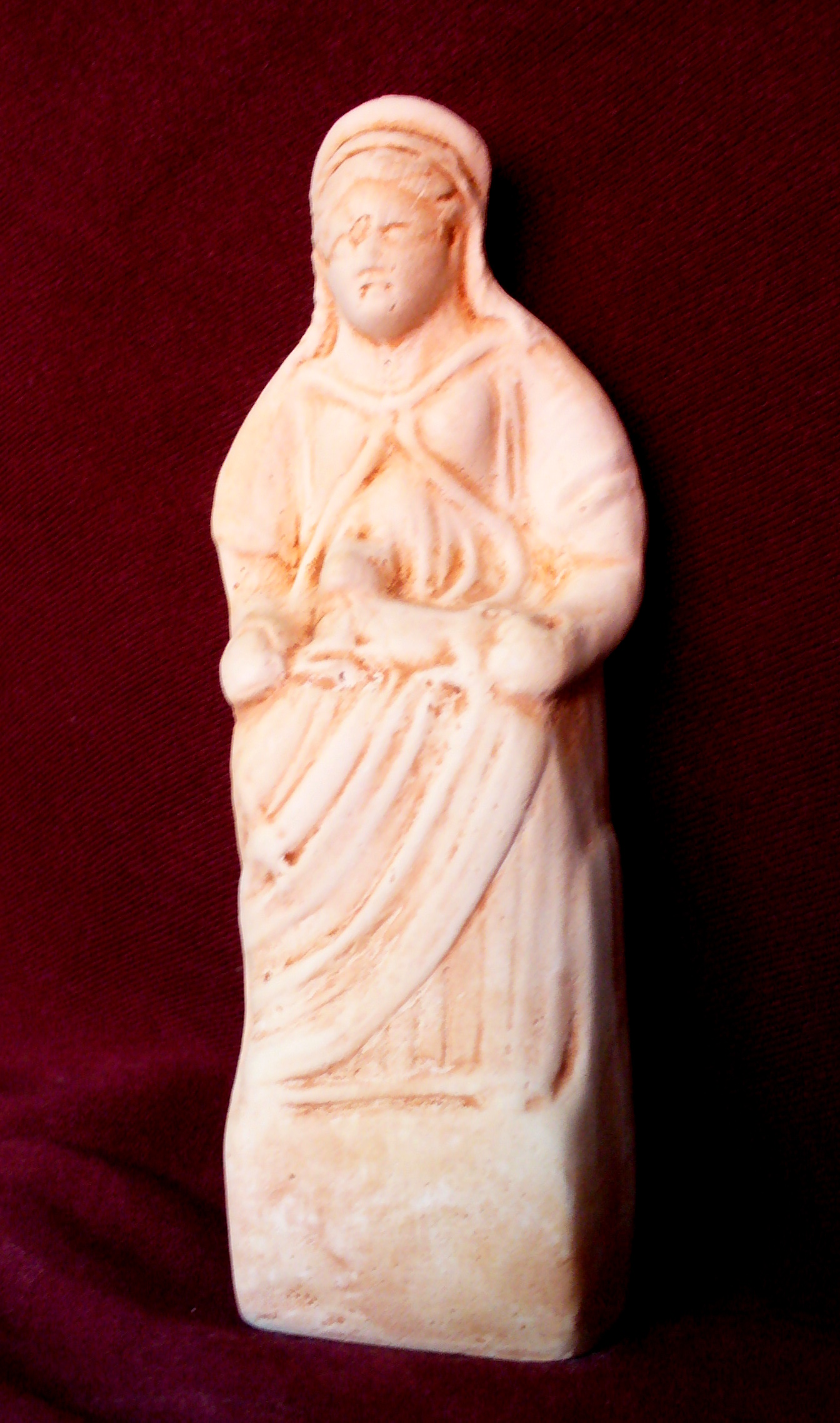
Aveta, or a similar mother goddess, as depicted on terracotta statuettes among the Treveri. (Replica)

Aveta was a Gaulish goddess worshipped chiefly among the Treveri, in the region of Trier. She was a mother goddess associated with fertility, and is known there from an altar and from small terracotta figurines. Her name also appears on a dedication from Mont-Afrique, near Dijon, and independently as a personal name.

== Name ==
Her name is recorded on two inscriptions from the Altbachtal temple precinct at Trier, and on a dedication from Mont-Afrique in Burgundy. The same name is also borne by a private individual.

== Cult ==
Aveta was venerated among the Treveri, to whom she appears to have been a local deity. In the Altbachtal temple precinct at Trier, an altar naming her was recovered from one of the temples, Building 17. Edith Wightman records that a temple to Aveta there was full of terracotta statuettes of the mother-goddess type. Similar clay figurines were dedicated at a rural sanctuary at Dhronecken nearby.

A dedication to Aveta was also found at Mont-Afrique, near Dijon, in a border zone between the Aedui and the Lingones. (Note: A second inscription from the same site, a lintel dedicated by a peregrine named Maurusio, no longer preserves the name of its deity. Marie-Thérèse Raepsaet-Charlier suggests that it too may have been dedicated to Aveta.) A possible further attestation at Avenches has been noted, though the reading is uncertain.

== Interpretation ==
Aveta is generally understood as a mother goddess of the Treveri. Miranda Aldhouse-Green further interprets her as a goddess of springs and of healing, and links her with the healing goddess Sirona.

The figurines associated with Aveta show a seated goddess holding a basket of fruit or a small dog in her lap, or nursing a swaddled child. Other examples depict a standing naked figure of the Venus type, which stresses her fertility. Some clay figures from the region carry emblems of corn or bread, or offer fruit to a small dog. Aldhouse-Green regards the dog as interchangeable with these fertility symbols, and takes it to express a healing or regenerative aspect of the goddess.

== Epigraphy ==
The name Aveta belongs both to a Celtic goddess and to private individuals, so that dedications to the deity must be distinguished from funerary and other texts that merely record persons of the name. The dedications naming the goddess are few. They come from Augusta Treverorum (Trier) among the Treveri, from Mont-Afrique in the territory of the Lingones, possibly from Aventicum (Avenches) in the land of the Helvetii.

Text	Find-spot	Divine name(s)	Translation	Reference	Comments
Avetae Acaunae Aug(ustae) Ser(vius) Sulpicius P(ubli) Plaut(us) v(otum) s(olvit) l(ibens) m(erito)	Avenches	Aveta (Acauna)	To Aveta Acauna Augusta, Servius Sulpicius Plautus, son of Publius, fulfilled his vow willingly and deservedly.	CIL XIII, 5074	Aveta bears the by-name Acauna and the imperial title Augusta. Re-edited as AE 2021, 962.
Deae Avetae adfines	Trier	Aveta	To the goddess Aveta, the relatives by marriage (dedicated this).	Finke 5	On a sculpted monument (CSIR Deutschland IV.3, 27). The dedicators are described as adfines.
[...] et deae Avetae Tib(erius) Venus[ti]us Vital(is) C(aius) Leusius Giamissa M(arcus) Tongon[i]us Iul(ius) Aivinius Lossa Va[...]inius Varus Annius Iarus Brittonius Hilarus d(ono) d(ederunt)	Trier	Aveta	To [...] and the goddess Aveta, the dedicators gave this as a gift.	Nesselhauf 1	Aveta is paired with a second deity whose name is lost at the beginning. Seven dedicators are named. On a sculpted monument (CSIR Deutschland IV.3, 28).
[deae] Aveta[e ...] Pater[...] v(otum) s(olvit)	Lingones territory	Aveta	[To the goddess] Aveta, Pater[...] fulfilled his vow.	ILTG 406	Fragmentary. The dedication to the goddess (deae) is restored. Exact find-spot not recorded.
