= Siberia =

Geographical region of Russia comprising North Asia

Siberia Сибирь
- Geographical region
- Interactive map of Siberia
- Coordinates: 61°0′N 105°0′E
- Continent: Asia
- Country: Russia
- Largest city: Novosibirsk
- Parts: Western Siberia/Ural Federal District; Central Siberia; Eastern Siberia

Area
  - Total: 13,100,000 km^{2} (5,100,000 sq mi)

Population (2023)
  - Total: 36.8 million
  - Density: 2.8/km^{2} (7.3/sq mi)
- Demonym: Siberians

GDP (2022)
  - Total: ₽ 41.783 trillion (USD 610 billion)
  - Per capita: ₽ 1,120,921 (USD 16367)

Siberia (/saɪˈbɪəriə/ sy-BEER-ee-ə; Russian: Сибирь, romanized: Sibir', IPA: [sʲɪˈbʲirʲ]) is an extensive geographical region comprising all of North Asia, from the Ural Mountains in the west (with the Ural River usually forming the southernmost portion of its western boundary) to the Pacific Ocean in the east. It has formed a part of the sovereign territory of Russia since the lengthy conquest of Siberia, which began with the fall of the Khanate of Sibir in 1582 and concluded with the annexation of Chukotka in 1778. Siberia is vast and sparsely populated, covering an area of over 13.1 million square kilometres (5,100,000 mi^{2}) – about three-quarters of Russia's total area, but home to roughly a quarter of Russia's population. Novosibirsk, Krasnoyarsk, and Omsk are its largest cities.

Because Siberia is a geographic and historic concept and not a political entity, there is no single precise definition of its territorial borders. It is further defined as stretching from the territories within the Arctic Circle in the north to the northern borders of Kazakhstan, Mongolia, and China in the south, although the hills of north-central Kazakhstan are also commonly included. The Russian government divides the region into three federal districts (groupings of Russian federal subjects), of which only the central one is officially referred to as "Siberian"; the other two are the Ural (which spans both Europe and western Siberia) and Far Eastern federal districts, named for the Ural and Russian Far East regions that correspond respectively to the western and eastern thirds of Siberia in the broader sense.

Siberia is known for its long, harsh winters, with a January average of −25 °C (−13 °F). Although it is geographically located in Asia, Russian sovereignty and colonization since the 16th century have led to perceptions of the region as culturally and ethnically European. Over 85% of its population are of European descent, chiefly Russian (comprising the Siberian sub-ethnic group), and Eastern Slavic cultural influences predominate throughout the region. Nevertheless, there are sizable ethnic minorities of Asian lineage, including various Turkic communities—many of which, such as the Yakuts, Tuvans, Altai, and Khakas, are Indigenous—along with the Mongolic Buryats, ethnic Koreans, and smaller groups of Samoyedic and Tungusic peoples (several of whom are classified as Indigenous small-numbered peoples by the Russian government), among many others.

== Etymology ==
The origin of the name is uncertain. In the Russian language, it was adopted as a toponym through contact with the Khanate of Sibir (Сибирское ханство) since the 15th century. The Russian name Yugra was applied to the northern lands east of the Ural Mountains, which had been known of since the 11th century or earlier, while the name Siberia is first mentioned in Russian chronicles at the start of the 15th century in connection with the death of the khan Tokhtamysh in "the Siberian land".

Some sources say that "Siberia" originates from the Siberian Tatar word for 'sleeping land' (Sib-ir), but this discourse does not correspond to the actual Siberian Tatar language. Mongolist György Kara posits that the toponym Siberia is derived from a Mongolic word sibir, cognate with modern Buryat sheber 'dense forest'. A different hypothesis claims that the region was named after the Sibe people.

Polish historian Jan Chyliczkowski has proposed that the name derives from the Proto-Slavic word for 'north' (cf. Russian север sever), as in Severia. Anatole Baikaloff has dismissed this explanation. He says that the neighboring Chinese, Turks, and Mongolians, who have similar names for the region, would not have known Russian. He suggests that the name might be a combination of two words with Turkic origin, su 'water' and bir 'wild land'.

== History ==
=== Prehistory ===
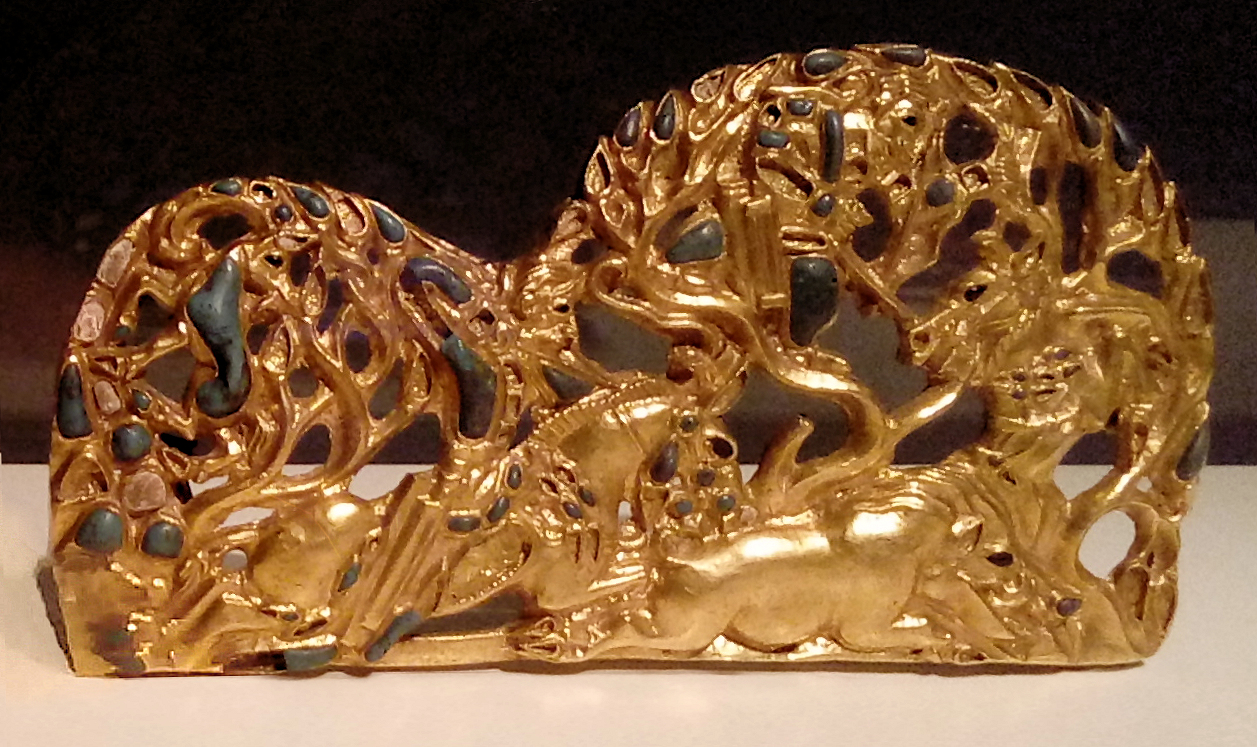
Horseman hunting, with characteristic Xiongnu horse trappings, southern Siberia, 280–180 BC. Hermitage Museum.

Siberia in Paleozoic times formed the continent of Siberia/Angaraland, which fused to Euramerica during the Late Carboniferous, as part of the formation of Pangea. The Siberian Traps were formed by one of the largest-known volcanic events of the last 251 million years of Earth's geological history. Their activity continued for a million years, and some scientists consider it a possible cause of the "Great Dying" about 250 million years ago, estimated to have killed 90% of species existing at the time.

The region has paleontological significance, as it contains bodies of prehistoric animals from the Pleistocene Epoch, preserved in ice or permafrost. Specimens of Goldfuss cave lion cubs, Yuka the mammoth and another woolly mammoth from Oymyakon, a woolly rhinoceros from the Kolyma, and bison and horses from Yukagir have been found. Remote Wrangel Island and the Taymyr Peninsula are believed to have been the last places on Earth to support woolly mammoths as isolated populations until their extinction around 2000 BC.

At least three species of humans lived in southern Siberia around 40,000 years ago: H. sapiens, H. neanderthalensis, and the Denisovans. In 2010, DNA evidence identified the last as a separate species. Late Paleolithic southern Siberians appear to be related to Paleolithic Europeans and the Paleolithic Jōmon people of Japan. DNA analysis has revealed that the oldest fossil known to carry the derived KITLG allele, which is responsible for blond hair in modern Europeans, is a 17,000 year old Ancient North Eurasian specimen from Siberia. Ancient North Eurasian populations genetically similar to Mal'ta–Buret' culture and Afontova Gora were an important genetic contributor to Native Americans, Europeans, Ancient Central Asians, South Asians, and some East Asian groups (such as the Ainu people). Evidence from full genomic studies suggests that the first people in the Americas diverged from Ancient East Asians about 36,000 years ago and expanded northwards into Siberia, where they encountered and interacted with Ancient North Eurasians, giving rise to both Paleosiberian peoples and Ancient Native Americans, which later migrated towards the Beringian region, became isolated from other populations, and subsequently populated the Americas.

=== Early history ===
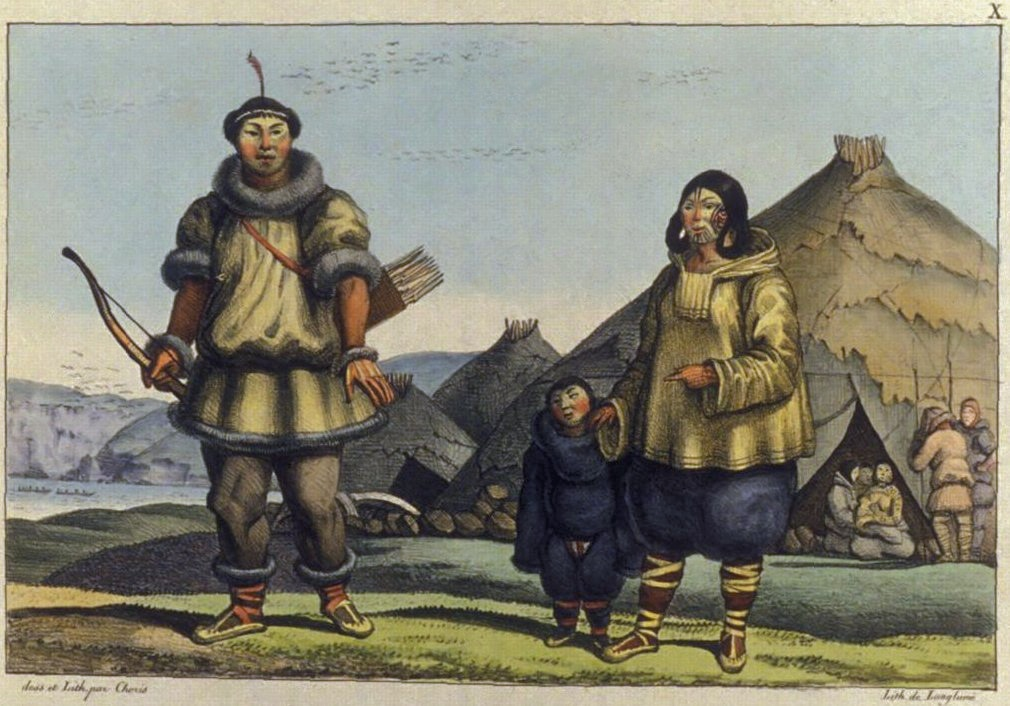
Chukchi, one of many Indigenous peoples of Siberia. Representation of a Chukchi family by Louis Choris (1816)

During past millennia, different groups of nomads – such as the Enets, the Nenets, the Huns, the Xiongnu, the Scythians, and the Yugur – inhabited various parts of Siberia. The Afanasievo and Tashtyk cultures of the Yenisey valley and Altay Mountains are associated with the Indo-European migrations across Eurasia. The proto-Mongol Khitan people, whose territory spanned a vast area, were also attested in the Ob region of western Siberia in the sixteenth century.

In the 13th century, during the period of the Mongol Empire, the Mongols conquered a large part of this area. With the breakup of the Golden Horde, the autonomous Khanate of Sibir was formed in the late 15th century. Turkic-speaking Yakut migrated north from the Lake Baikal region under pressure from the Mongol tribes from the 13th to 15th centuries. Siberia remained a sparsely populated area. Historian John F. Richards writes: "it is doubtful that the total early modern Siberian population exceeded 300,000 persons".

==== Early Russian exploration ====
The first mention of Siberia in chronicles is recorded in 1032. The city-state of Novgorod established two trade routes to the Ob River, and laid claim to the lands the Russians called Yugra. The Russians were attracted by its furs in particular. Novgorod launched military campaigns to extract tribute from the local population but often met resistance, such as two campaigns in 1187 and 1193 mentioned in chronicles that were defeated. After Novgorod was annexed by Moscow, the newly emerging centralized Russian state also laid claim to the region, with Ivan III of Russia sending expeditionary forces to Siberia in 1483 and 1499–1500. The Russians received tribute, but contact with the tribes ceased after they left.

The growing power of the Tsardom of Russia began to undermine the Siberian Khanate in the 16th century. First, groups of traders and Cossacks began to enter the area. The Russian army was directed to establish forts farther and farther east to protect new Russian settlers who migrated from Europe. Towns such as Mangazeya, Tara, Yeniseysk, and Tobolsk developed, the last becoming the de facto capital of Siberia from 1590. At this time, Sibir was the name of a fortress at Qashliq, near Tobolsk. Gerardus Mercator, in a map published in 1595, marks Sibier both as the name of a settlement and of the surrounding territory along a left tributary of the Ob. Other sources contend that the Sibe, an indigenous Tungusic people, offered fierce resistance to Russian expansion beyond the Urals. Some suggest that the term "Siberia" is a Russified version of their ethnonym.

=== Russian Empire ===
Coat of arms of Siberia, which was a part of the Russian Imperial Coat of Arms until 1917

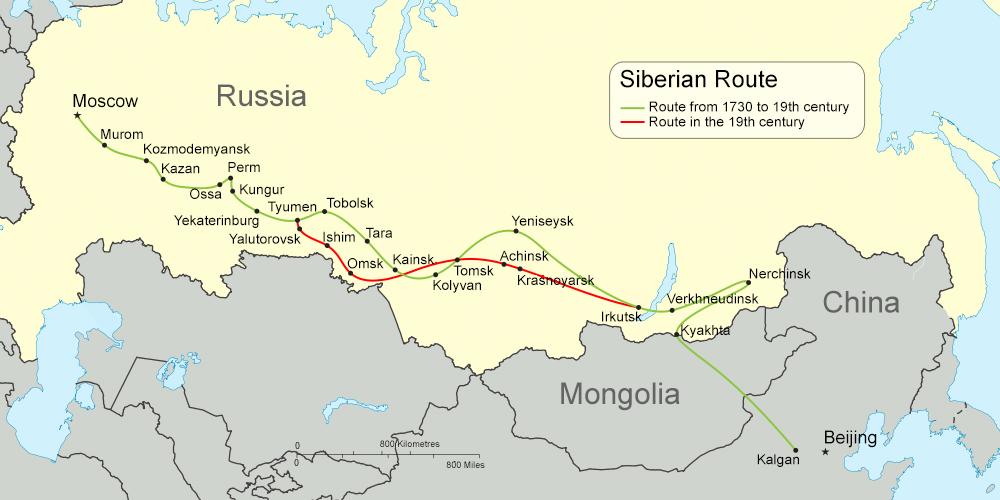
Map of the Siberian Route in the 18th century (green) and the early 19th century (red)

By the mid-17th century, Russia had established areas of control that extended to the Pacific Ocean. Some 230,000 Russians had settled in Siberia by 1709. Siberia became one of the destinations for sending internal exiles. Exile was the main Russian punitive practice with more than 800,000 people exiled during the 19th century.

The first great modern change in Siberia was the Trans-Siberian Railway, constructed during 1891–1916. It linked Siberia more closely to the rapidly industrialising Russia of Nicholas II. Around seven million Russians moved to Siberia from Europe between 1801 and 1914. Between 1859 and 1917, more than half a million people migrated to the Russian Far East. Siberia has extensive natural resources: during the 20th century, large-scale exploitation of these took place, and industrial towns cropped up throughout the region.

At 7:15 a.m. on 30 June 1908, the Tunguska event felled millions of trees near the Podkamennaya Tunguska River (Stony Tunguska River) in central Siberia. Most scientists believe this resulted from the air burst of a meteor or comet. Even though no crater has ever been found, the landscape in the (sparsely inhabited) area still bears the scars of this event.

=== Soviet Union ===
In the early decades of the Soviet Union (especially in the 1930s and 1940s), the government used the Gulag state agency to administer a system of penal labour camps, replacing the previous katorga system. According to semi-official Soviet estimates, which did not become public until after the fall of the Soviet government in 1991, from 1929 to 1953 more than 14 million people passed through these camps and prisons, many of them in Siberia. Another seven to eight million people were internally deported to remote areas of the Soviet Union (including entire nationalities or ethnicities in several cases).

Half a million (516,841) prisoners died in camps from 1941 to 1943 during World War II. At other periods, mortality was comparatively lower. The size, scope, and scale of the Gulag slave-labour camps remain subjects of much research and debate. Many Gulag camps operated in extremely remote areas of northeastern Siberia. The best-known clusters included Sevvostlag (the North-East Camps) along the Kolyma and Norillag near Norilsk, where 69,000 prisoners lived in 1952. Major industrial cities of northern Siberia, such as Norilsk and Magadan, developed from camps built by prisoners and run by former prisoners.

=== Russian Federation ===
After the Soviet collapse in 1991, Siberia faced severe economic decline during Russia's transition to a market economy, characterized by hyperinflation, industrial collapse, and resource privatization. While the idea of a Siberian Republic for more regional autonomy was discussed and a Siberian Agreement was formed in the 1990s, the region remained consolidated under Russian federal authority. Economic shifts led to increased resource-based specialization and a decline in the population, particularly in the Russian Arctic, as the previous focus on industrial settlements was largely abandoned.

On 2 December 2019, the 'Power of Siberia' gas pipeline started functioning. The project was started in 2014 to supply natural gas from Siberia to China.

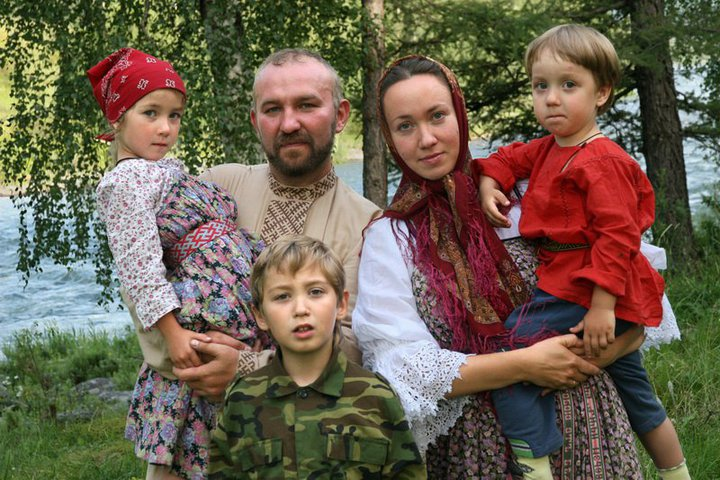
Siberian Cossack family in Novosibirsk, after 2000

== Geography ==
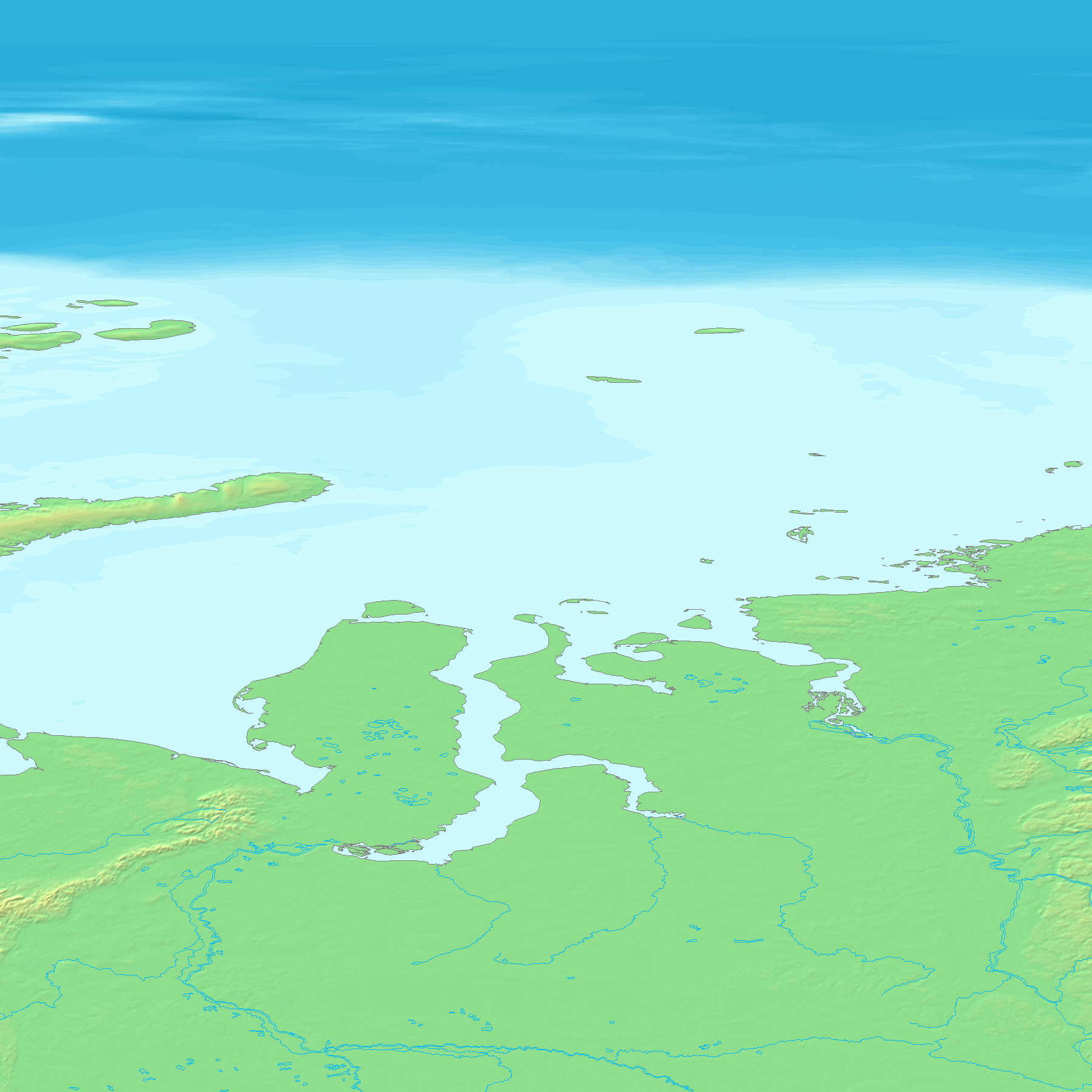

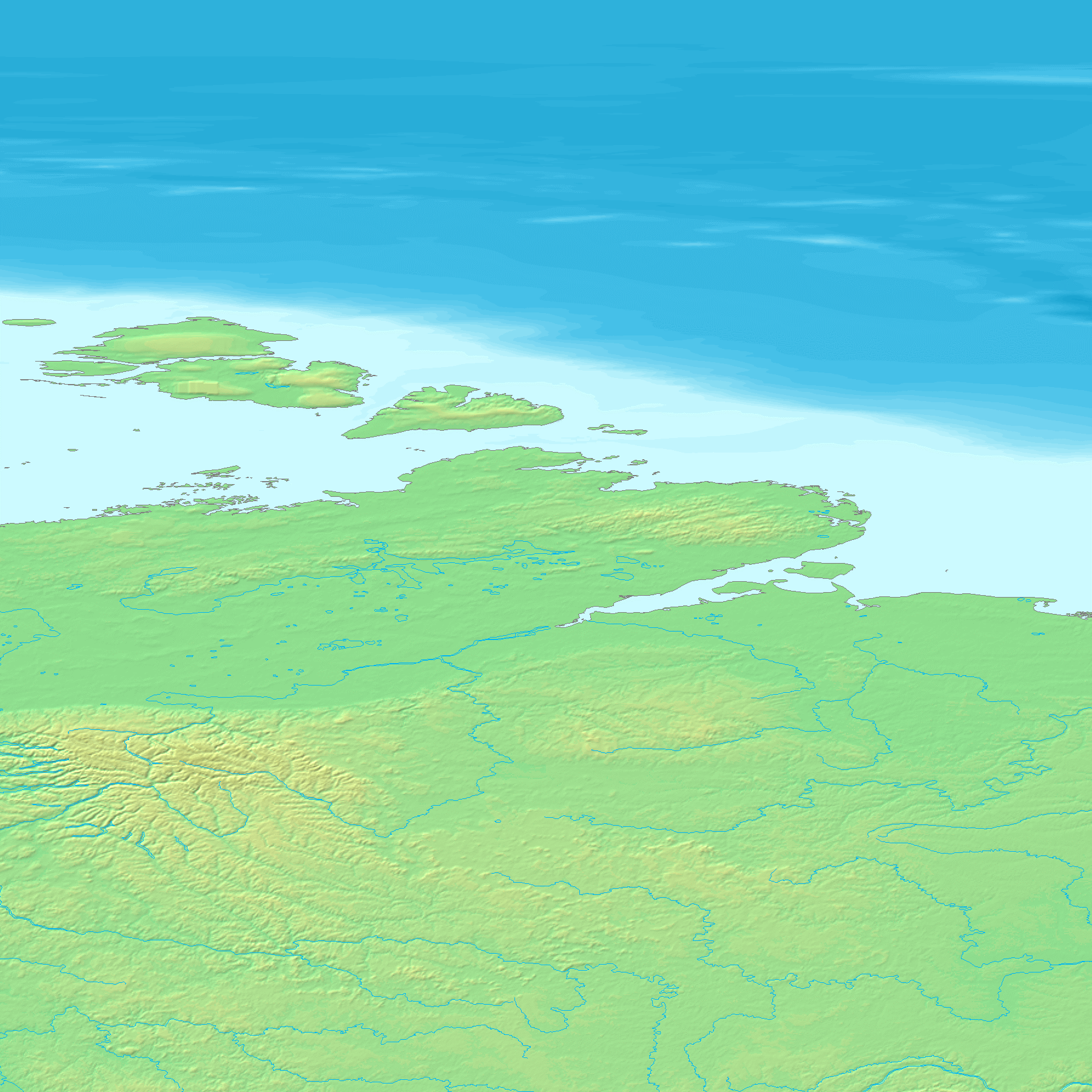

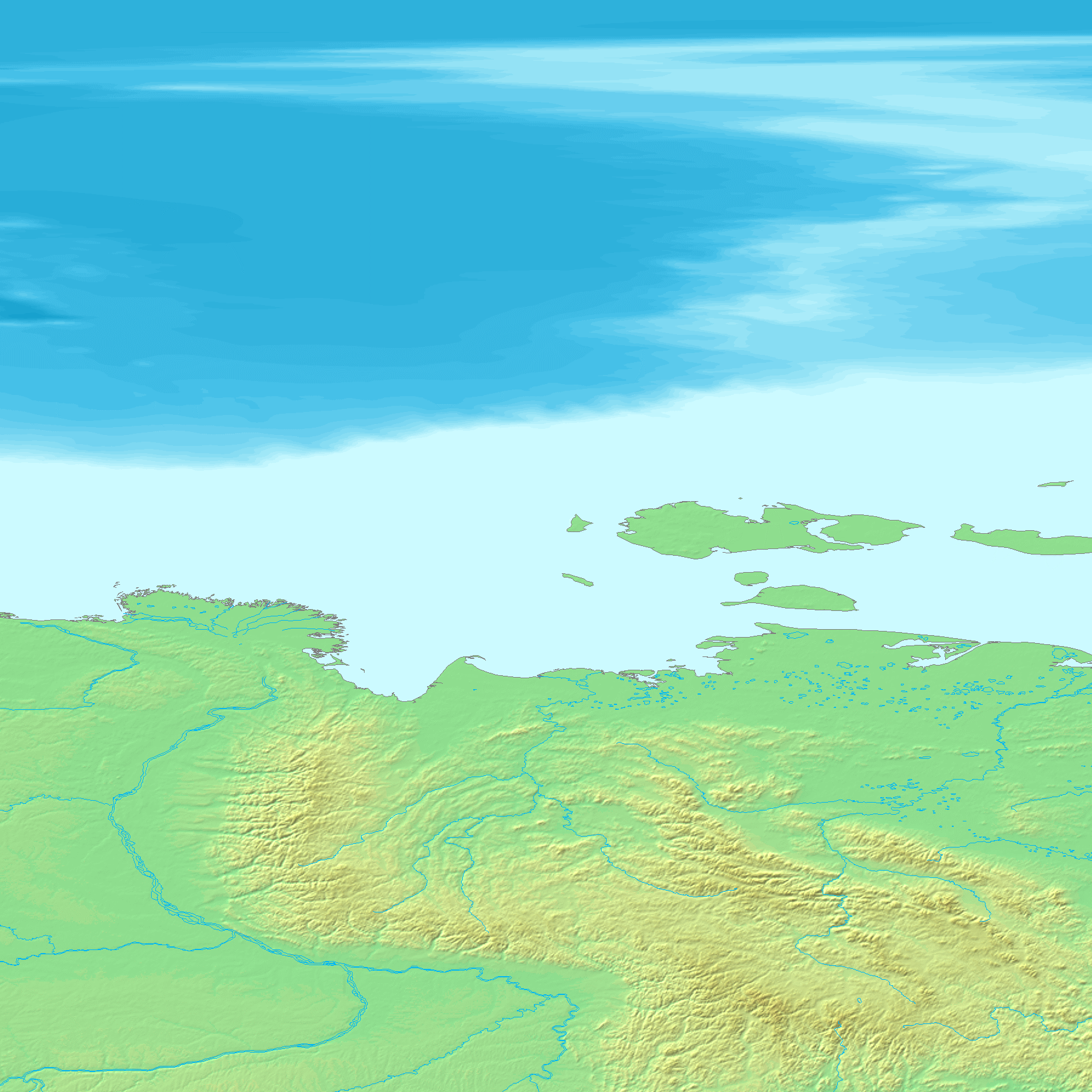

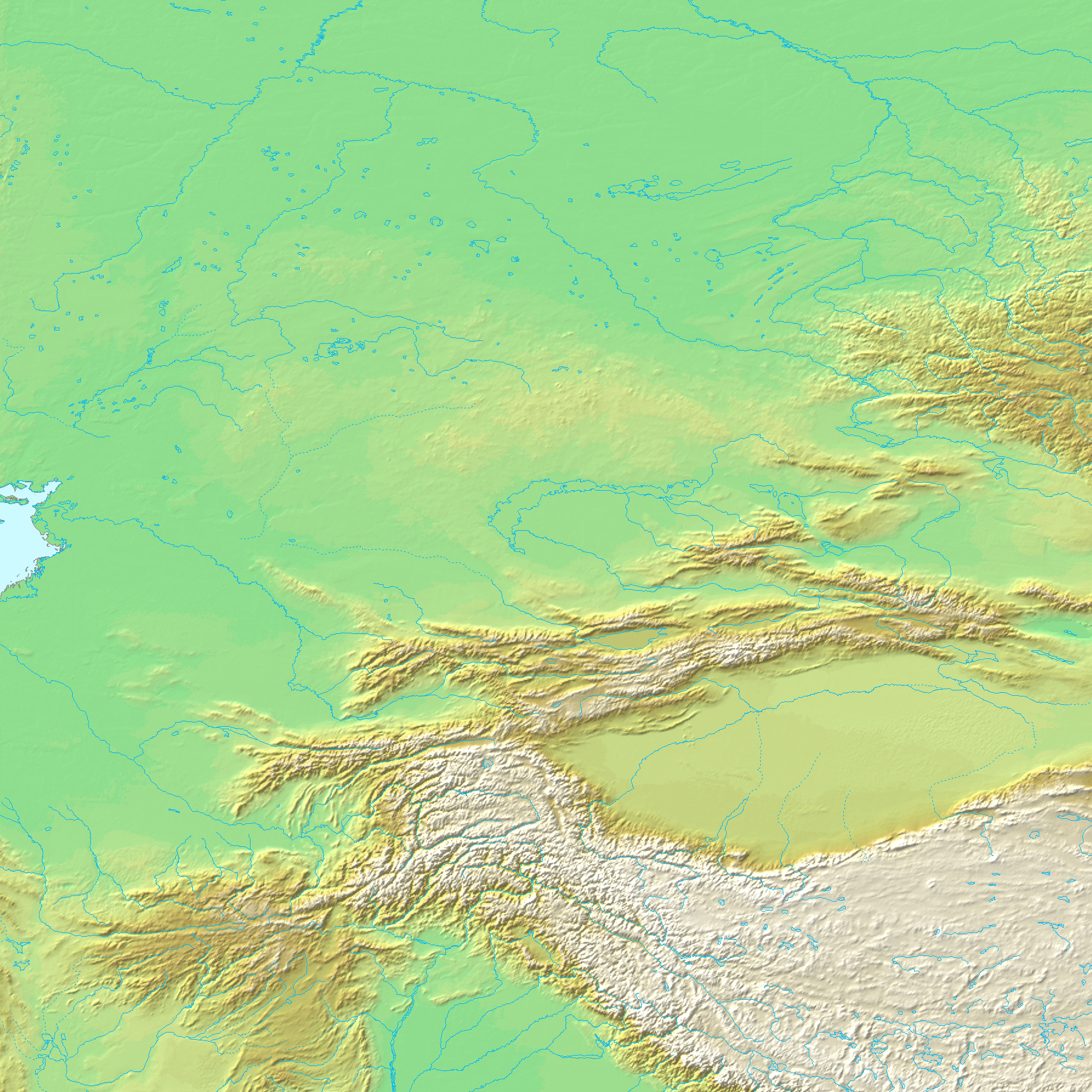

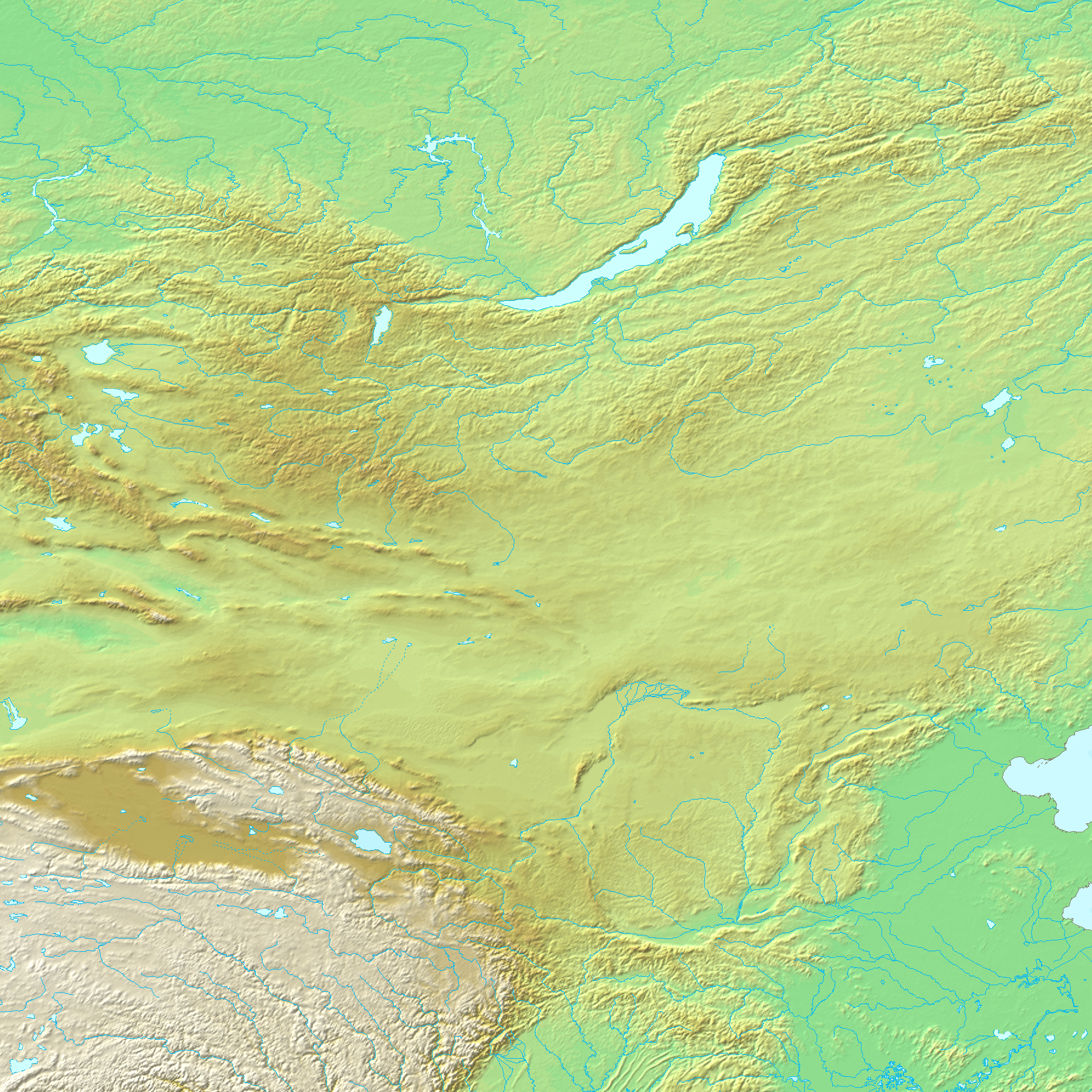

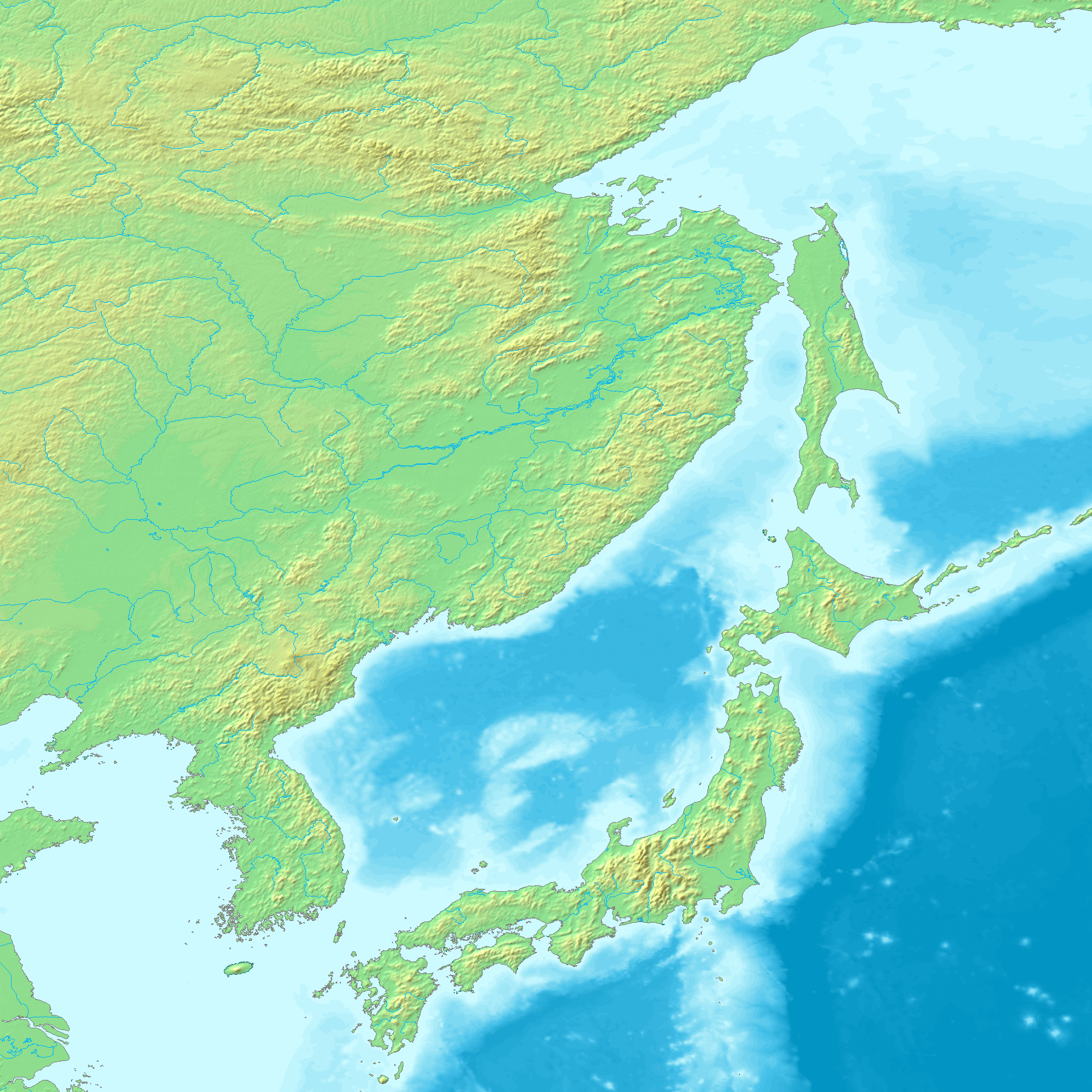

Physical map of Northern Asia (with parts of Central and East Asia)

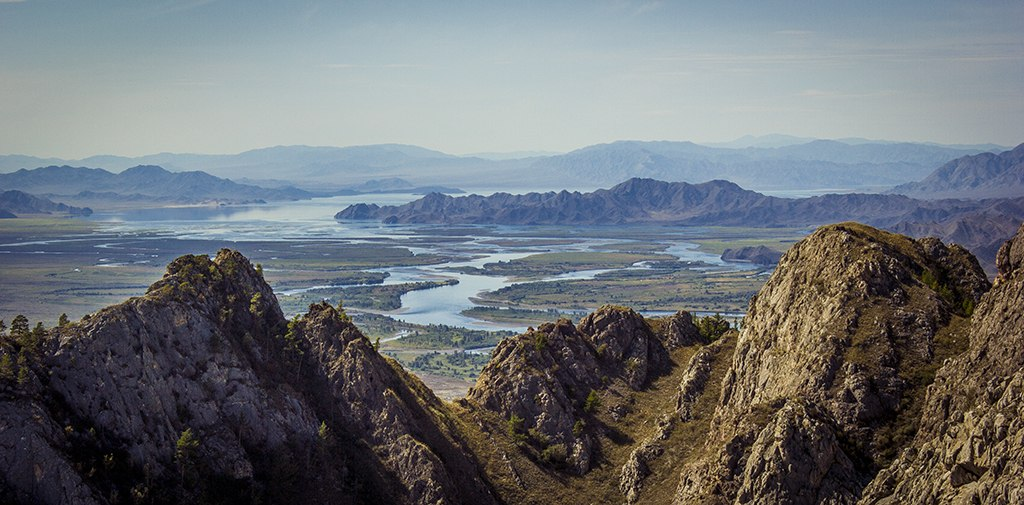
View from Haiyrakan mountain, Tuva

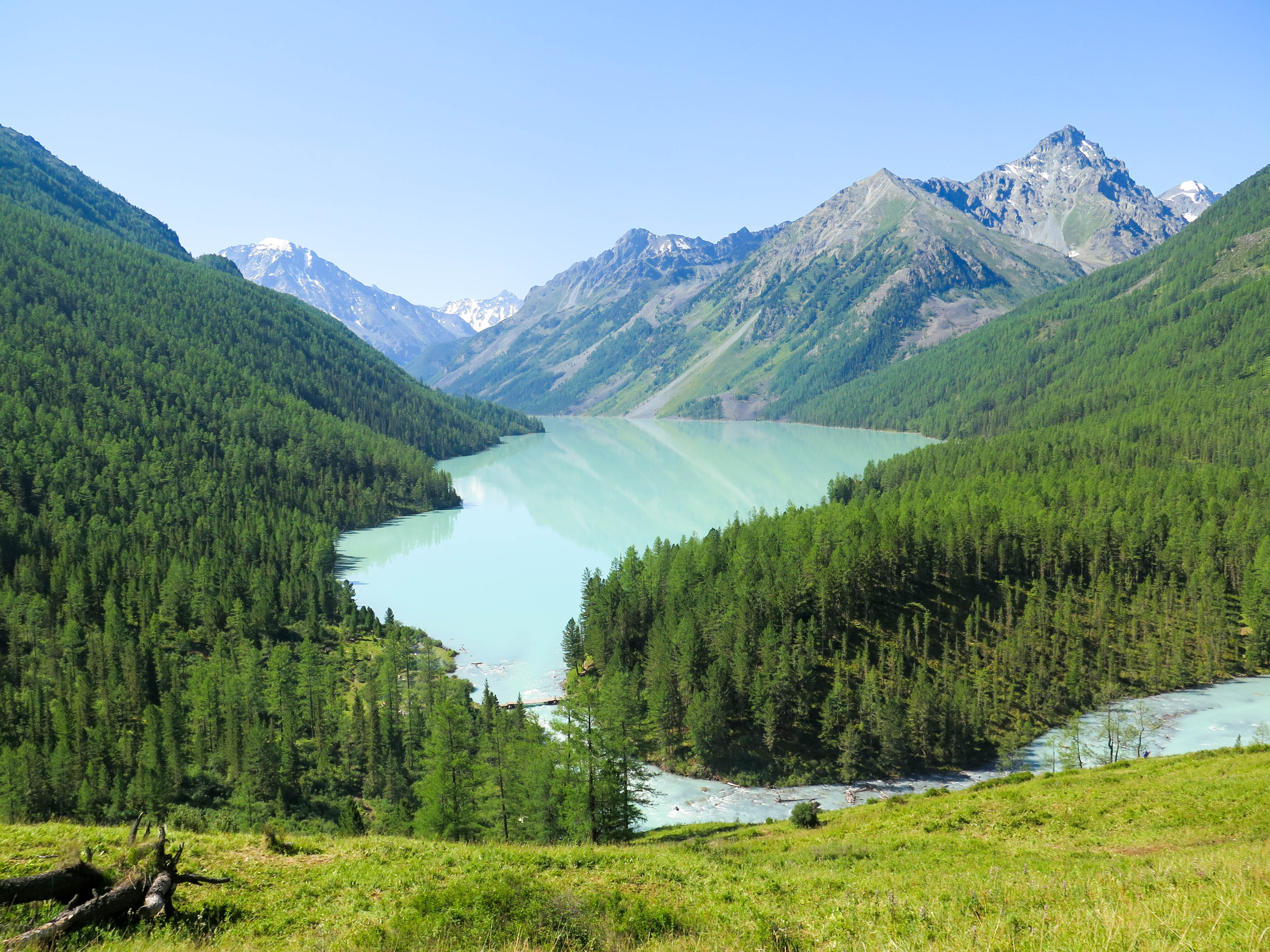
Altai, Lake Kutsherla in the Altai Mountains

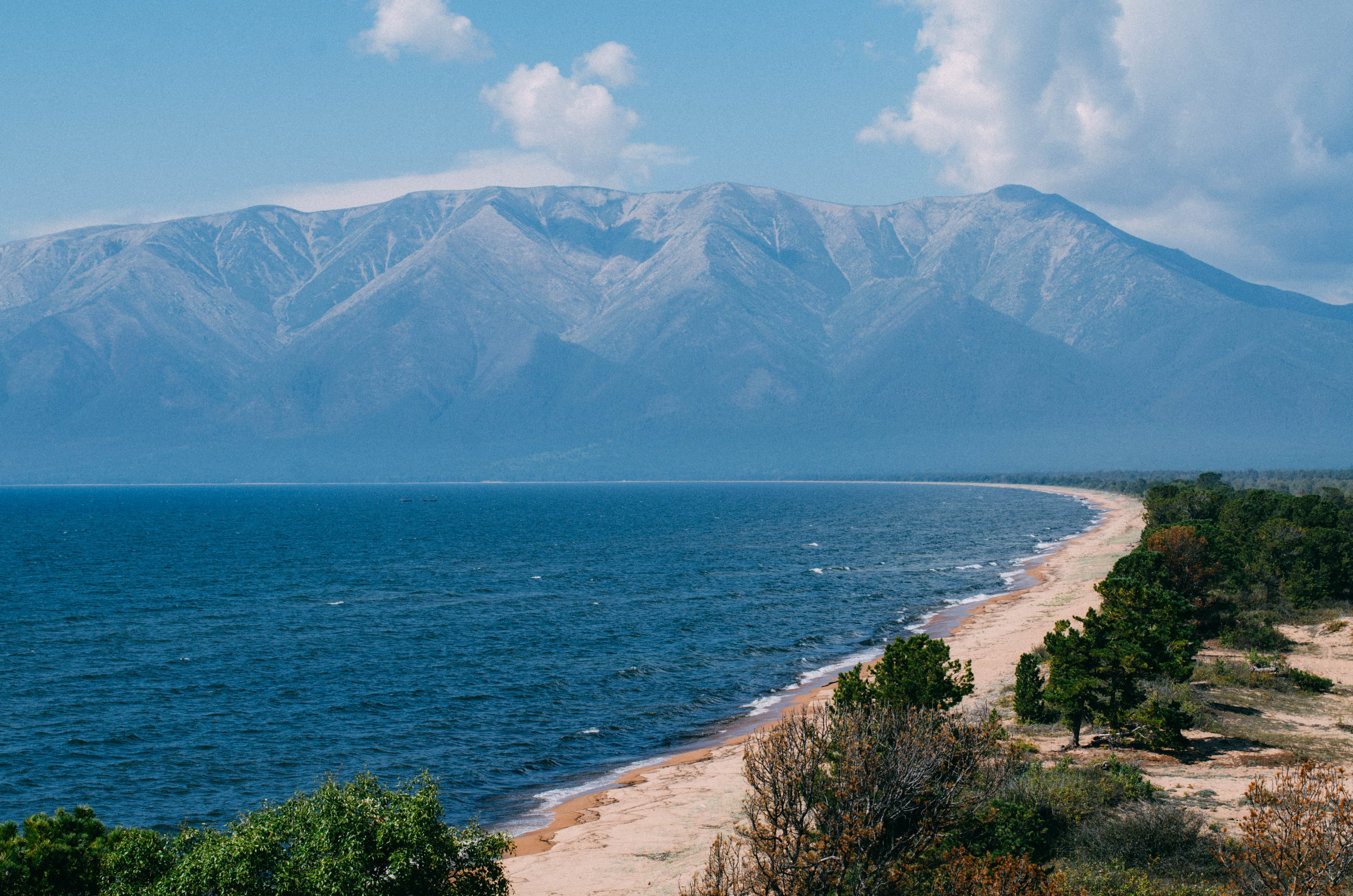
The peninsula of Svyatoy Nos, Lake Baikal

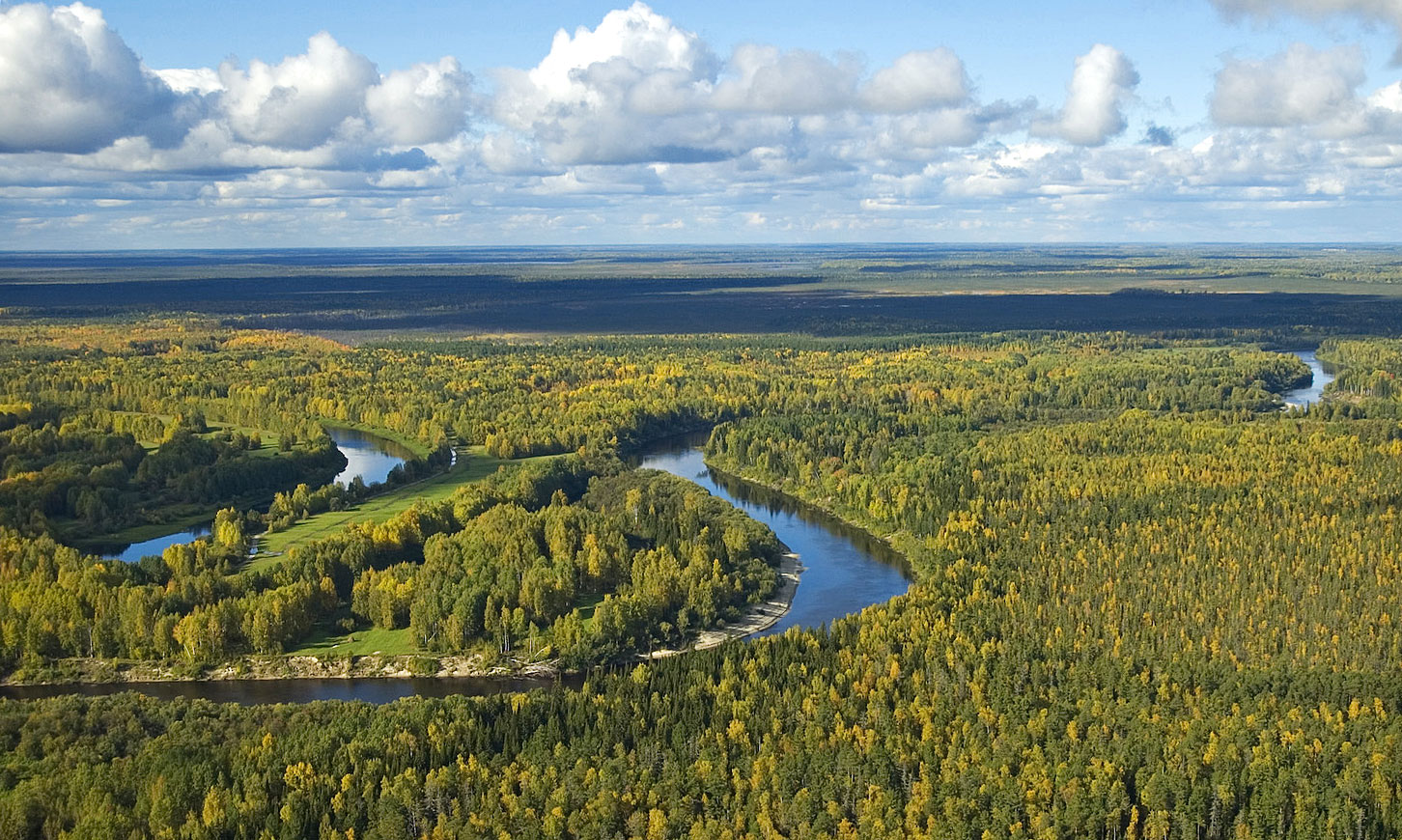
The river Vasyugan in the southern West Siberian Plain

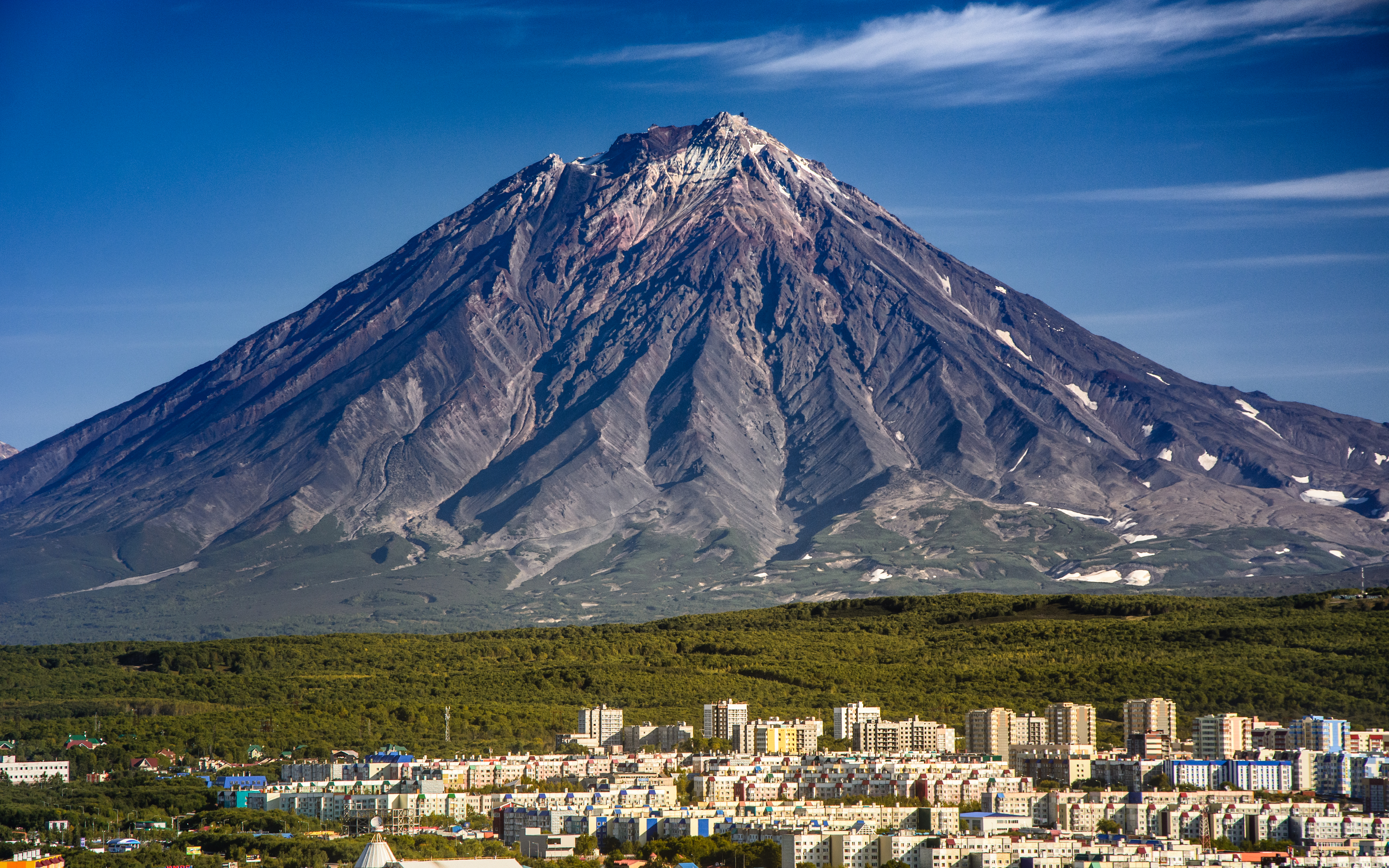
Koryaksky volcano towering over Petropavlovsk-Kamchatsky on the Kamchatka Peninsula

Siberia spans an area of 13.1 million square kilometres (5,100,000 mi^{2}), covering most of Russia's total territory and almost 9% of Earth's land surface (148,940,000 km^{2}, 57,510,000 sq mi). It geographically falls in Asia but is culturally and politically considered European, since it is a part of Russia. Major geographical zones include the West Siberian Plain and the Central Siberian Plateau.

Eastern and central Sakha comprises numerous north–south mountain ranges of various ages. These mountains rise to almost 3,000 metres (9,800 ft), but above a few hundred metres they are almost completely devoid of vegetation. The Verkhoyansk Range was extensively glaciated in the Pleistocene, but the climate was too dry for glaciation to extend to low elevations. At these low elevations are numerous valleys, many of them deep and covered with larch forest, except in the extreme north where the tundra dominates. Soils are mainly turbels (a type of gelisol). The active layer tends to be less than one metre deep, except near rivers.

The highest point is the active volcano Klyuchevskaya Sopka, on the Kamchatka Peninsula. Its peak reaches 4,750 metres (15,580 ft). The Ukok Plateau is a UNESCO World Heritage Site.

=== Mountain ranges ===
- Altai Mountains
- Anadyr Highlands
- Baikal Mountains
- Khamar-Daban
- Chersky Range
- Chukotka Mountains
- Dzhugdzhur Mountains
- Kolyma Mountains
- Koryak Mountains
- Sayan Mountains
- Tannu-Ola Mountains
- Ural Mountains
- Verkhoyansk Mountains
- Yablonoi Mountains

=== Geomorphological regions ===
- Central Siberian Plateau
- Central Yakutian Lowland
- East Siberian Lowland
- East Siberian Mountains
- North Siberian Lowland
- South Siberian Mountains
- West Siberian Lowland

=== Lakes and rivers ===
- Alazeya
- Anabar
- Angara
- Indigirka
- Irtysh
- Kolyma
- Lake Baikal
- Lena
- Nizhnyaya Tunguska
- Novosibirsk Reservoir
- Ob
- Podkamennaya Tunguska
- Popigay
- Upper Angara
- Uvs Nuur
- Yana
- Yenisey

=== Geology ===
The West Siberian Plain, consisting mostly of Cenozoic alluvial deposits, is somewhat flat. In the mid-Pleistocene, many deposits on this plain resulted from ice dams which produced a large glacial lake. This mid- to late-Pleistocene lake blocked the northward flow of the Ob and Yenisey rivers, resulting in a redirection southwest into the Caspian and Aral seas via the Turgai Valley. The area is very swampy, and soils are mostly peaty histosols and, in the treeless northern part, histels. In the south of the plain, where permafrost is largely absent, rich grasslands that are an extension of the Kazakh Steppe formed the original vegetation, most of which is no longer visible.

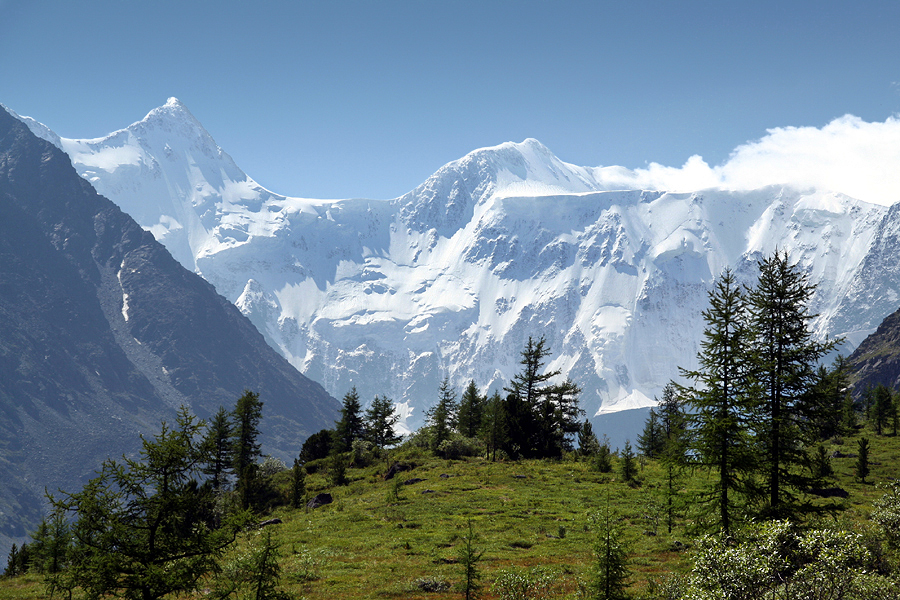
Belukha Mountain

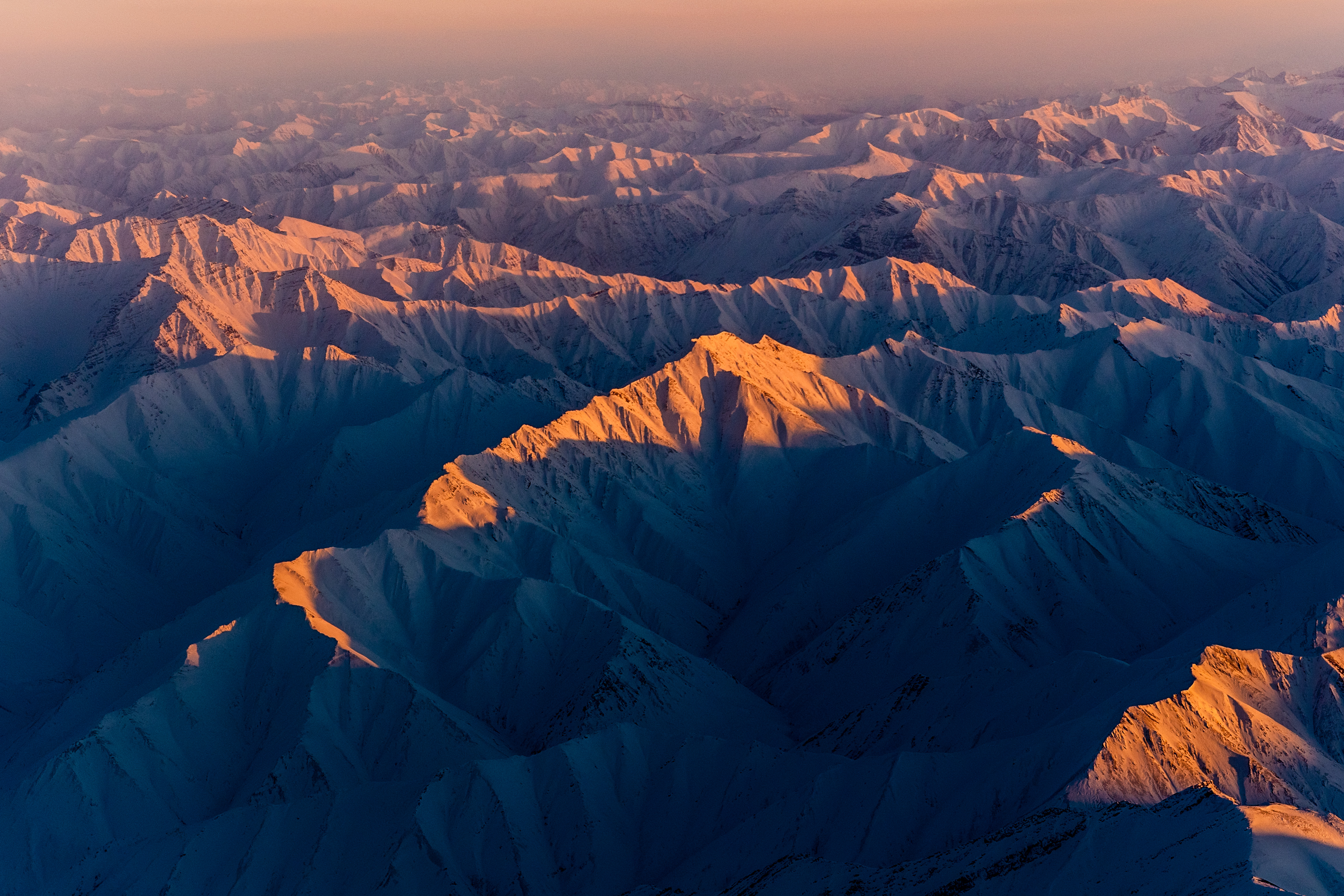
Verkhoyansk Range

The Central Siberian Plateau is an ancient craton (sometimes named Angaraland) that formed an independent continent before the Permian. It is exceptionally rich in minerals, containing large deposits of gold, diamonds, and ores of manganese, lead, zinc, nickel, cobalt, and molybdenum. Much of the area includes the Siberian Traps—a large igneous province. A massive eruptive period approximately coincided with the Permian–Triassic extinction event; the volcanic event is one of the largest known volcanic eruptions in Earth's history. Only the extreme northwest was glaciated during the Quaternary but almost all is under exceptionally deep permafrost, and the only tree that can thrive, despite the warm summers, is the deciduous Siberian Larch (Larix sibirica) with its very shallow roots. Outside the extreme northwest, the taiga is dominant, covering a significant fraction of the entirety of Siberia. Soils here are mainly turbels, giving way to spodosols where the active layer becomes thicker and the ice-content lower.

The Lena-Tunguska petroleum province includes the Central Siberian platform (some authors refer to it as the "Eastern Siberian platform"), bounded on the northeast and east by the late Carboniferous through Jurassic Verkhoyansk fold belt, on the northwest by the Paleozoic Taymr fold belt, and on the southeast, south and southwest by the Middle Silurian to Middle Devonian Baykalian fold belt. A regional geologic reconnaissance study begun in 1932 and followed by surface and subsurface mapping revealed the Markova-Angara Arch (anticline). This led to the discovery of the Markovo Oil Field in 1962 with the Markovo–1 well, which produced from the early Cambrian Osa Horizon bar-sandstone at a depth of 2,156 metres (7,073 ft). The Sredne-Botuobin Gas Field was discovered in 1970, producing from the Osa and the Proterozoic Parfenovo Horizon. The Yaraktin Oil Field was discovered in 1971, producing from the Vendian Yaraktin Horizon at depths of up to 1,750 metres (5,740 ft), which lies below Permian to lower Jurassic basalt traps.

=== Climate ===
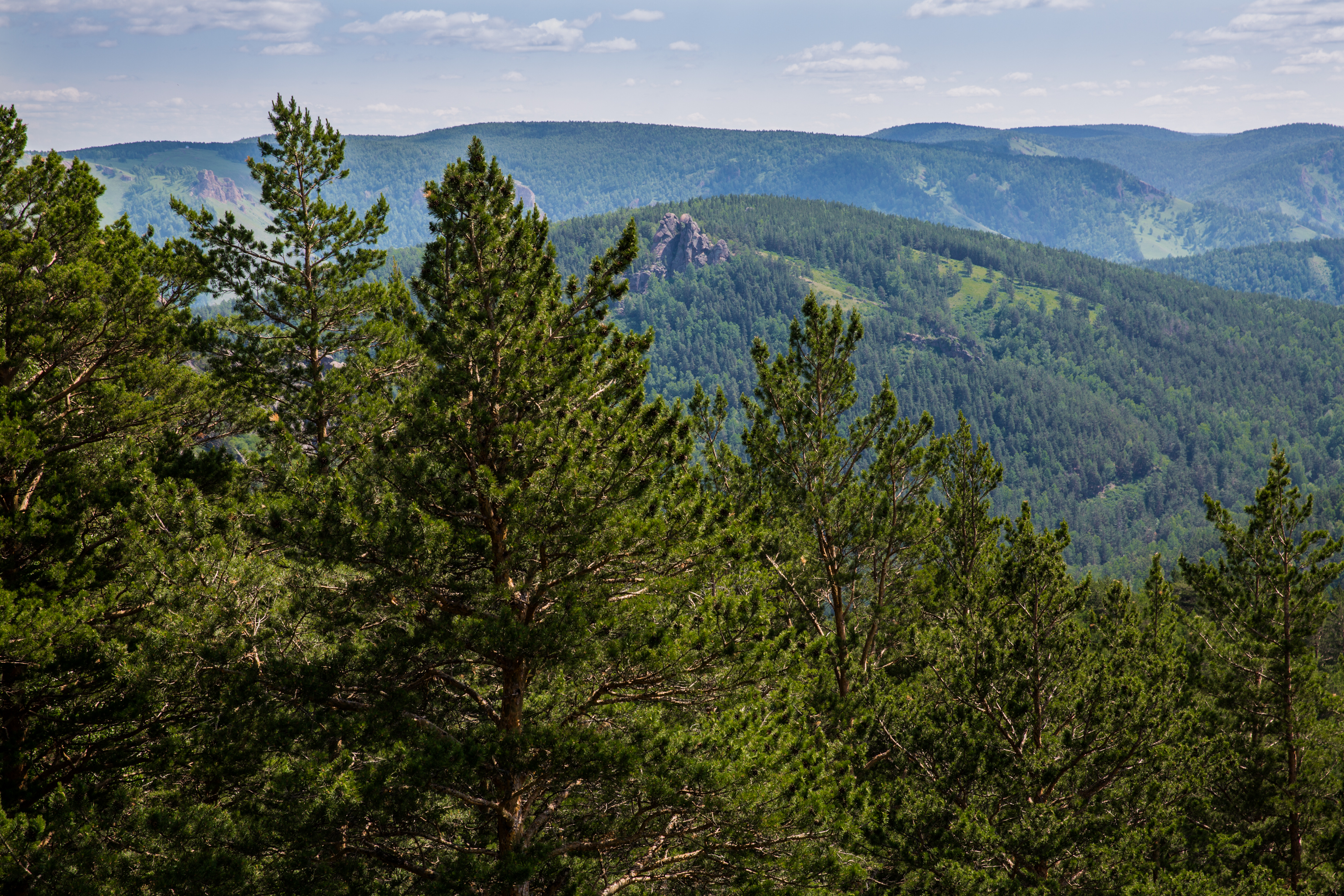
Siberian taiga

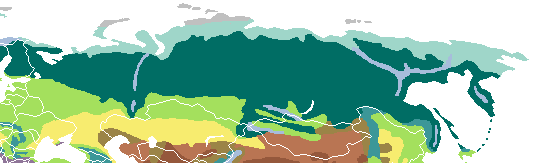
polar desert tundra alpine tundra taiga montane forest temperate broadleaf forest temperate steppe dry steppe Vegetation in Siberia mostly consists of taiga, with a tundra belt on the northern fringe, and a temperate forest zone in the south.

The climate varies dramatically, as Siberia is located in the Arctic, subarctic and temperate climate zones. It typically has warm but short summers, and long, extremely cold winters. On the north coast, north of the Arctic Circle, there is a very short (about one month long) summer.

Almost all the population lives in the south, along the route of the Trans-Siberian Railway. The climate in this southernmost part is humid continental climate (Köppen Dfa/Dfb or Dwa/Dwb) with cold winters but fairly warm summers lasting at least four months. The annual average temperature is about 0.5 °C (32.9 °F). January averages about −20 °C (−4 °F) and July about +19 °C (66 °F), while daytime temperatures in summer typically exceed 20 °C (68 °F). With a reliable growing season, an abundance of sunshine and fertile chernozem soils, southern Siberia is acceptable for profitable agriculture, as was demonstrated in the early 20th century.

Most of Siberia lies in a continental subarctic climate (Koppen Dfc, Dwc, or Dsc), with the annual average temperature about −5 °C (23 °F) and an average for January of −25 °C (−13 °F) and an average for July of +17 °C (63 °F), although this varies considerably, with an average for January as low as −48 °C (−54 °F) in the Sakha Republic to −20 °C (−4 °F) in the south of the West Siberian Plain. The July average ranges from 5 °C (41 °F) in the north to 23 °C (73 °F) in the south.

Business Insider lists Verkhoyansk and Oymyakon, in Sakha, as being in competition for the title of the "Pole of Cold:" the coldest inhabited point in the Northern Hemisphere. Oymyakon recorded a temperature of −67.7 °C (−89.9 °F) on 6 February 1933. Verkhoyansk, further north and further inland, recorded a temperature of −69.8 °C (−93.6 °F) for three consecutive nights: 5, 6 and 7 February 1933. Each town also frequently reaches 30 °C (86 °F) in the summer, giving them, and much of the rest of Russian Siberia, the world's greatest temperature variation between summer's highs and winter's lows, often well over 94–100+ °C (169–180+ °F) between the seasons.

Southwesterly winds bring warm air from Central Asia and the Middle East. The climate in West Siberia (Omsk, or Novosibirsk) is several degrees warmer than in the East (Irkutsk, or Chita). But summer temperatures in other regions can reach +38 °C (100 °F). In general, Sakha is the coldest Siberian region, and the basin of the Yana has the lowest temperatures of all, with permafrost reaching 1,493 metres (4,898 ft). Nevertheless, Imperial Russian plans of settlement never viewed cold as an impediment. In the winter, southern Siberia sits near the center of the semi-permanent Siberian High, so winds are usually light in the winter.

Precipitation is generally low, exceeding 500 millimetres (20 in) only in Kamchatka, where moist winds flow from the Sea of Okhotsk onto high mountains – producing the region's only major glaciers, though volcanic eruptions and low summer temperatures allow only limited forests to grow. Precipitation is high in most of Primorye in the extreme south, where monsoonal influences can produce quite heavy summer rainfall.

Climate data for Novosibirsk, Siberia's largest city
Month	Jan	Feb	Mar	Apr	May	Jun	Jul	Aug	Sep	Oct	Nov	Dec	Year
Mean daily maximum °C (°F)	−12.2 (10.0)	−10.3 (13.5)	−2.6 (27.3)	8.1 (46.6)	17.5 (63.5)	24.0 (75.2)	25.7 (78.3)	22.2 (72.0)	16.6 (61.9)	6.8 (44.2)	−2.9 (26.8)	−8.9 (16.0)	7.0 (44.6)
Daily mean °C (°F)	−16.2 (2.8)	−14.7 (5.5)	−7.2 (19.0)	3.2 (37.8)	11.6 (52.9)	18.2 (64.8)	20.2 (68.4)	17.0 (62.6)	11.5 (52.7)	3.4 (38.1)	−6 (21)	−12.7 (9.1)	2.4 (36.3)
Mean daily minimum °C (°F)	−20.1 (−4.2)	−19.1 (−2.4)	−11.8 (10.8)	−1.7 (28.9)	5.6 (42.1)	12.3 (54.1)	14.7 (58.5)	11.7 (53.1)	6.4 (43.5)	0.0 (32.0)	−9.1 (15.6)	−16.4 (2.5)	−2.3 (27.9)
Average precipitation mm (inches)	19 (0.7)	14 (0.6)	15 (0.6)	24 (0.9)	36 (1.4)	58 (2.3)	72 (2.8)	66 (2.6)	44 (1.7)	38 (1.5)	32 (1.3)	24 (0.9)	442 (17.4)

==== Global warming ====
According to Vasily Kryuchkov, approximately 31,000 square kilometers of the Russian Arctic has been subjected to severe environmental disturbance. Researchers, including Sergei Kirpotin at Tomsk State University and Judith Marquand at Oxford University, warn that Western Siberia has begun to thaw as a result of global warming. The frozen peat bogs in this region may hold billions of tons of methane gas which may be released into the atmosphere. Methane is a greenhouse gas 22 times more powerful than carbon dioxide. In 2008 a research expedition for the American Geophysical Union detected levels of methane up to 100 times above normal in the atmosphere above the Siberian Arctic, likely the result of methane clathrates being released through holes in a frozen "lid" of seabed permafrost around the outfall of the Lena and the area between the Laptev Sea and East Siberian Sea.

Since 1988, experimentation at Pleistocene Park has proposed to restore the grasslands of prehistoric times by conducting research on the effects of large herbivores on permafrost, suggesting that animals, rather than climate, maintained the past ecosystem. The nature reserve park also conducts climatic research on the changes expected from the reintroduction of grazing animals or large herbivores, hypothesizing that a transition from tundra to grassland would lead to a net change in energy emission to absorption ratios.

== Fauna ==
=== Birds ===
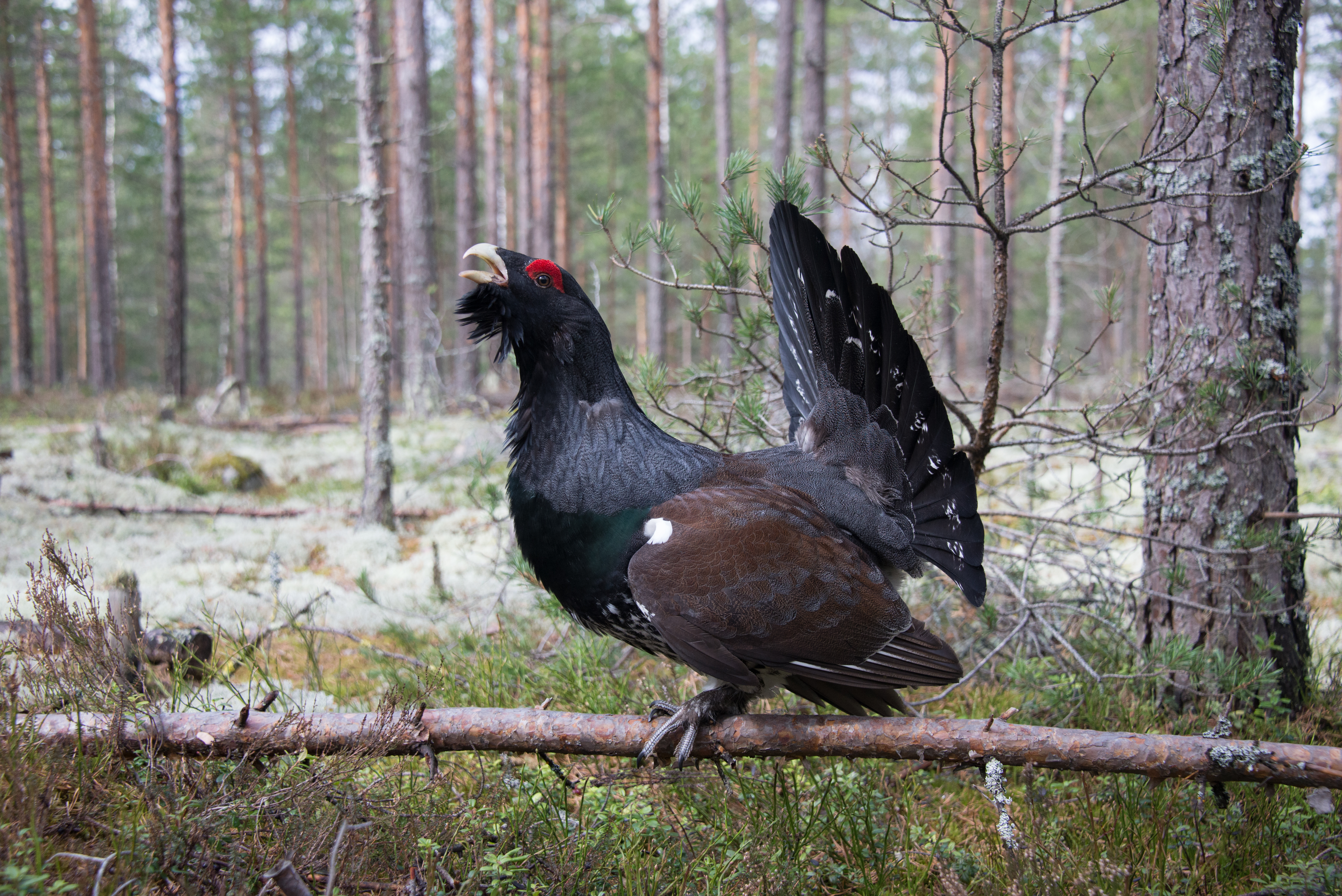
Capercaillies inhabit much of the Siberian taiga.

=== Order Galliformes ===
==== Family Phasianidae ====
- Hazel grouse
- Siberian grouse
- Black grouse
- Black-billed capercaillie
- Western capercaillie
- Willow ptarmigan
- Rock ptarmigan
- Daurian partridge
- Grey partridge
- Altai snowcock
- Japanese quail
- Common quail
- Ring-necked pheasant

=== Order Artiodactyla ===
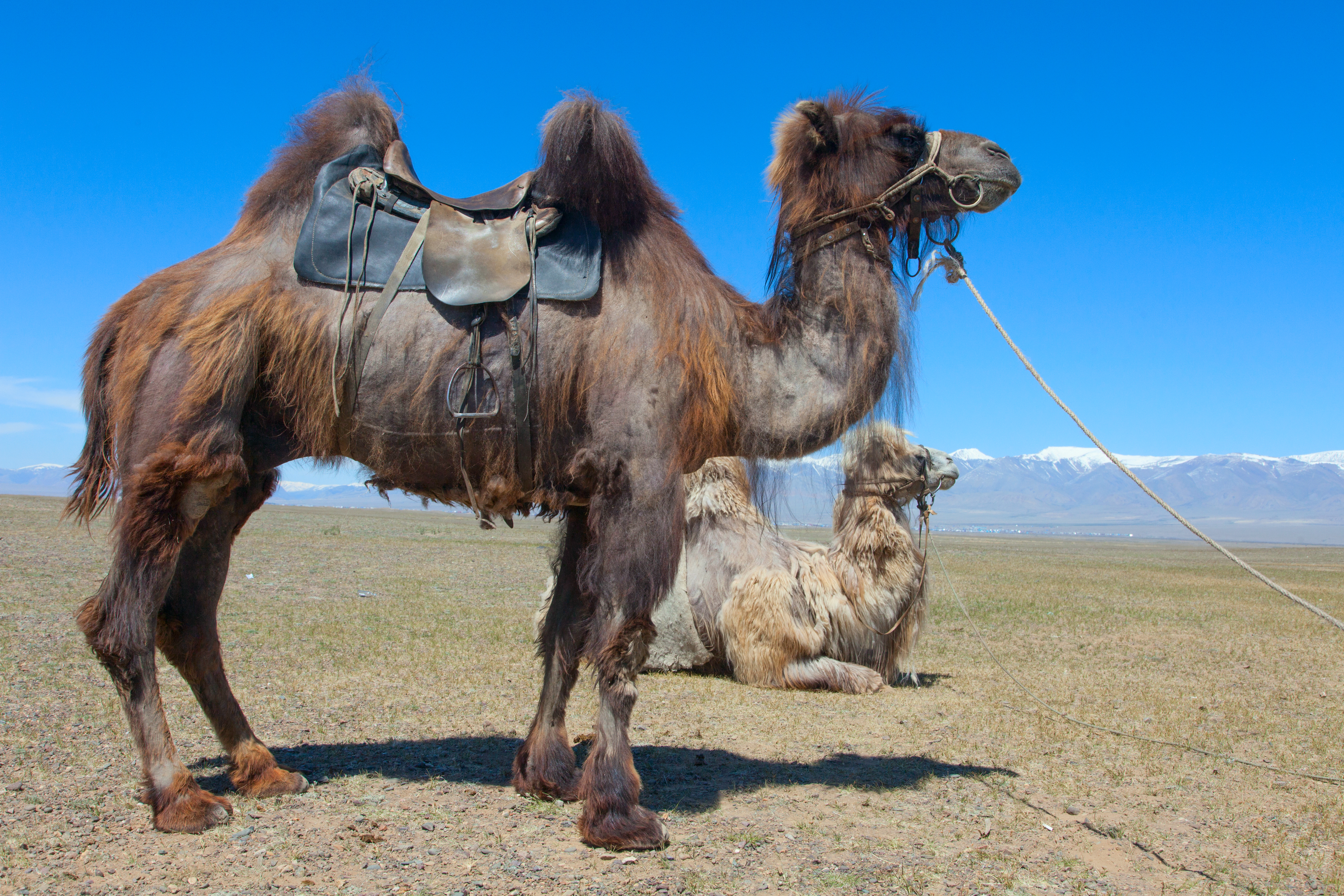
Two saddled Bactrian camels shedding their coats in the Altai mountain range

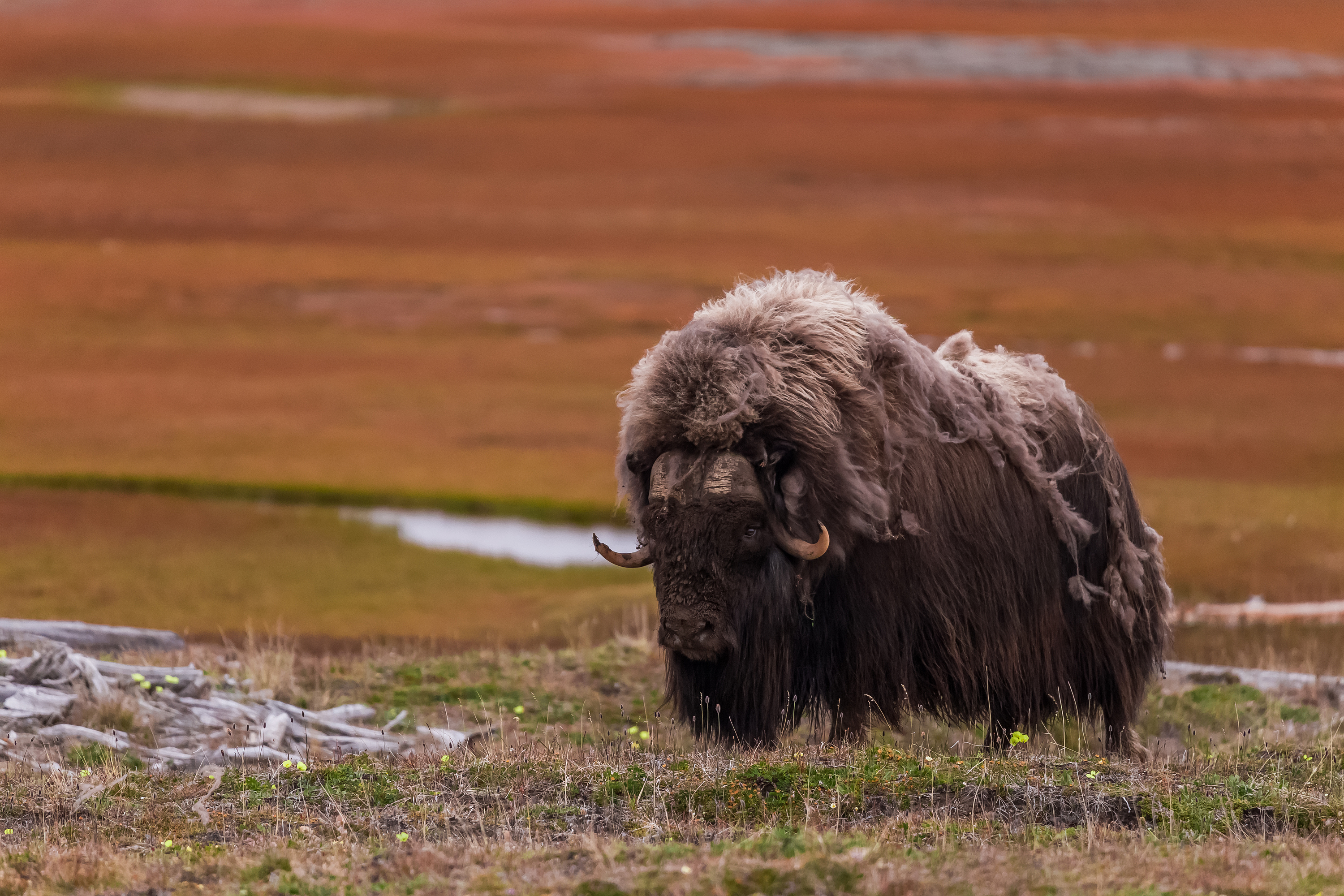
A muskox on Bolshoy Begichev Island in Laptev Sea

- Moose
- Bactrian camel
- Red deer
- Wild boar
- Siberian roe deer
- Manchurian wapiti
- Siberian musk deer

=== Order Carnivora ===
==== Family Canidae ====
- Grey wolf
- Tundra wolf
- Arctic fox
- Red fox

==== Family Felidae ====
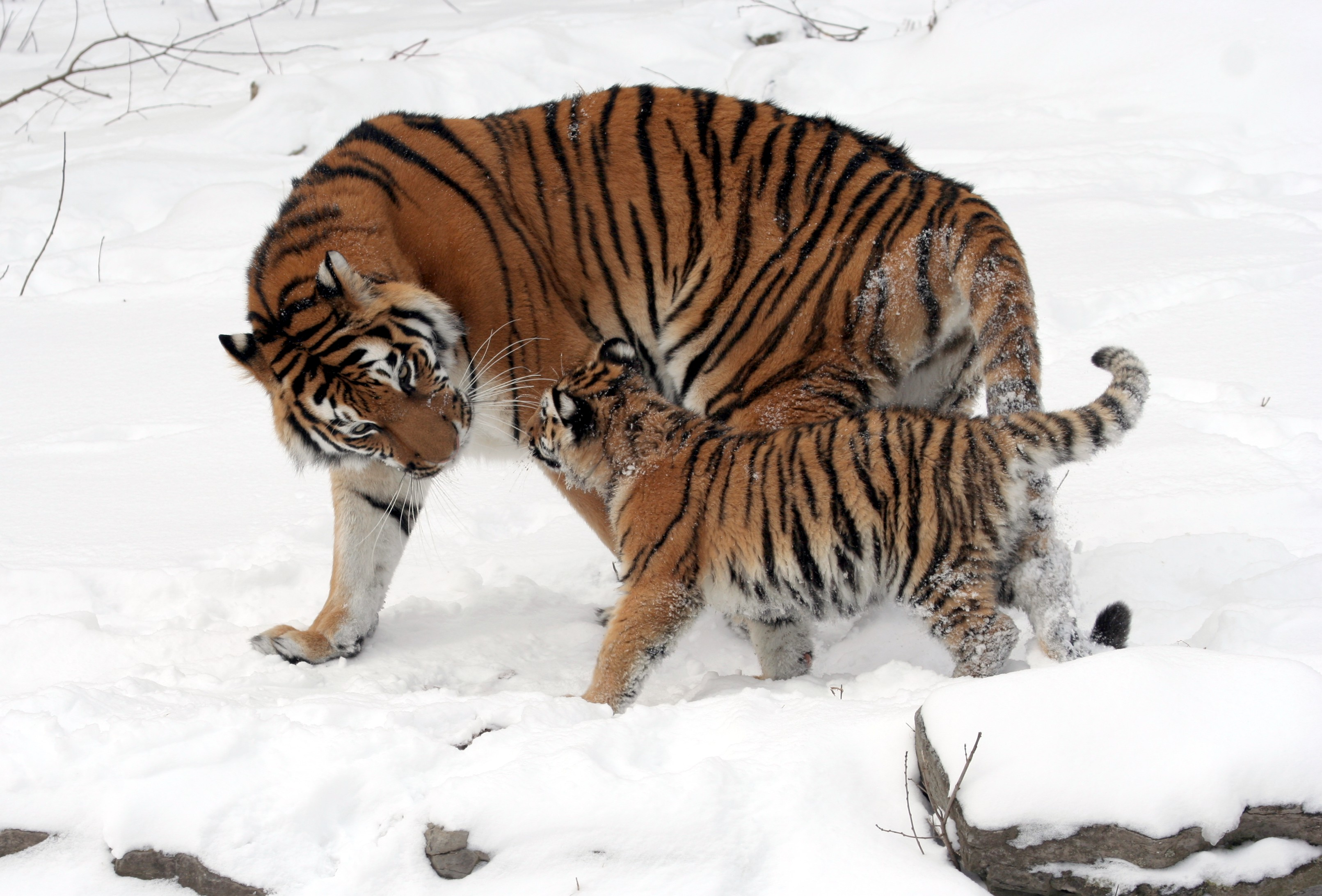
A Siberian tigress and cub

- Snow leopard
- Amur leopard
- Siberian tiger
- Eurasian lynx
- Pallas cat

==== Family Mustelidae ====
- Least weasel
- Stoat
- Mountain weasel
- Siberian weasel
- Steppe polecat
- Sable
- Eurasian river otter
- Asian badger
- Wolverine

==== Family Ursidae ====
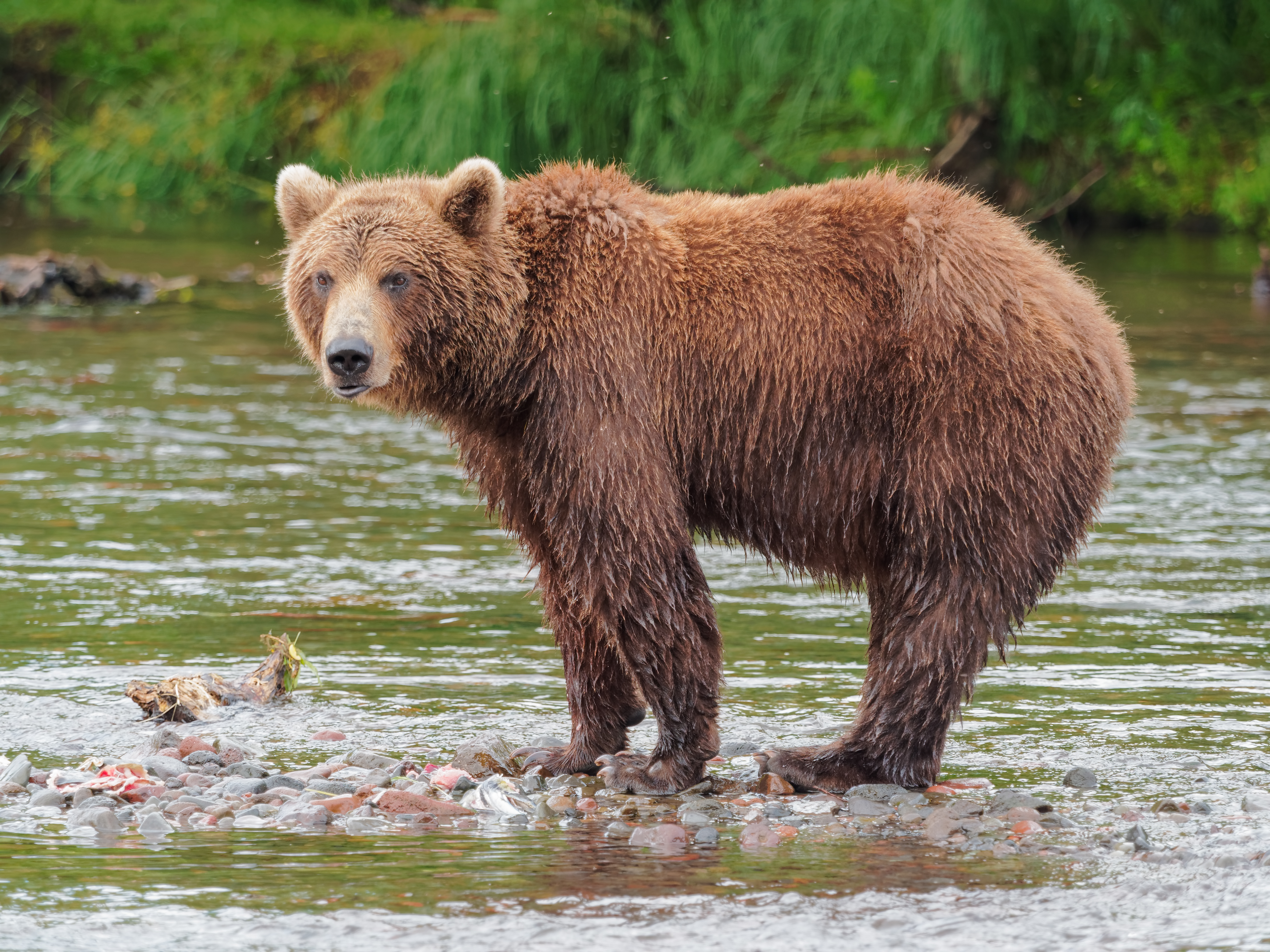
Kamchatka brown bear at Kamchatka Peninsula

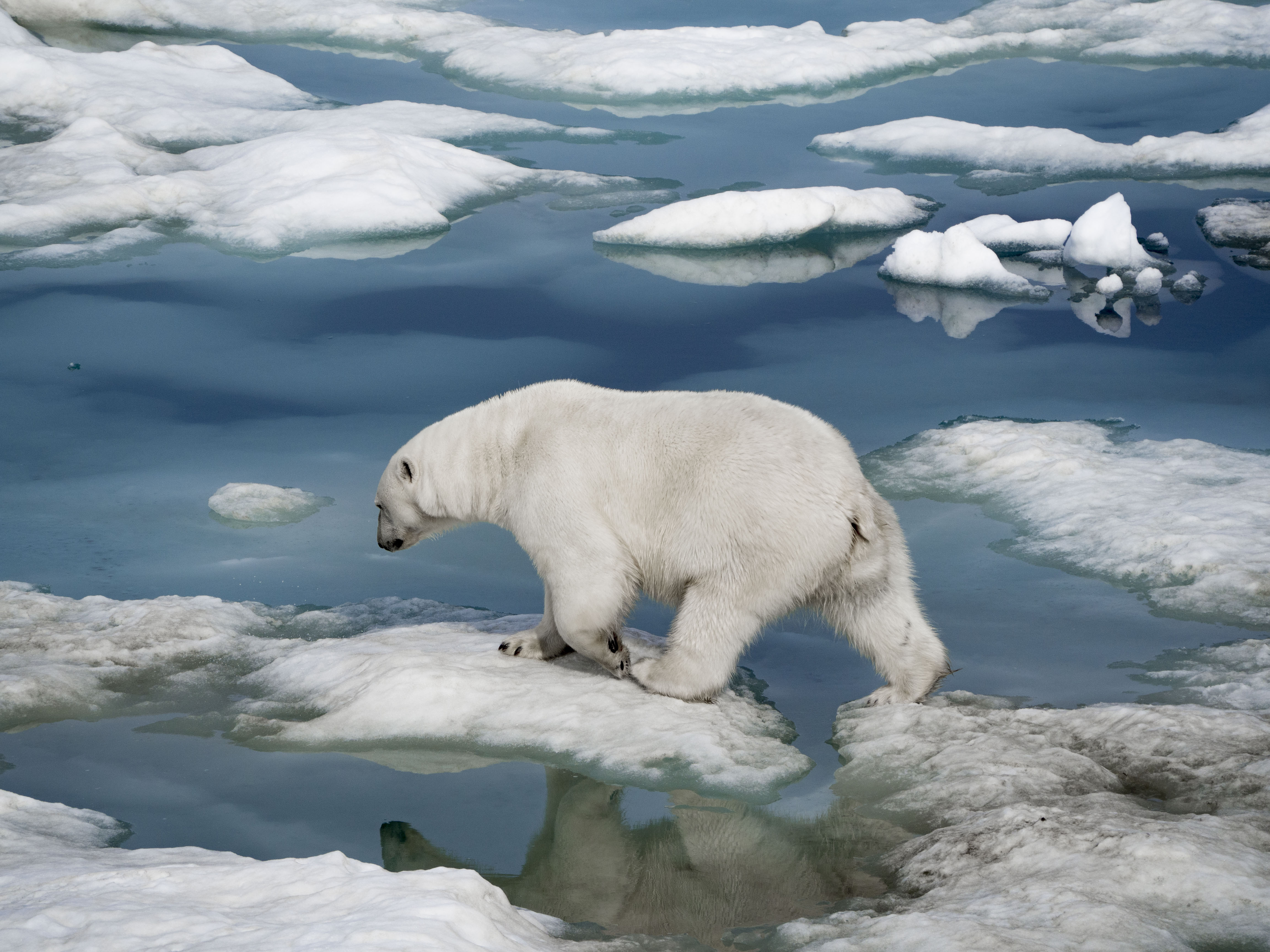
Polar bear on Wrangel Island

- Asian black bear
- Brown bear
- Polar bear

== Flora ==
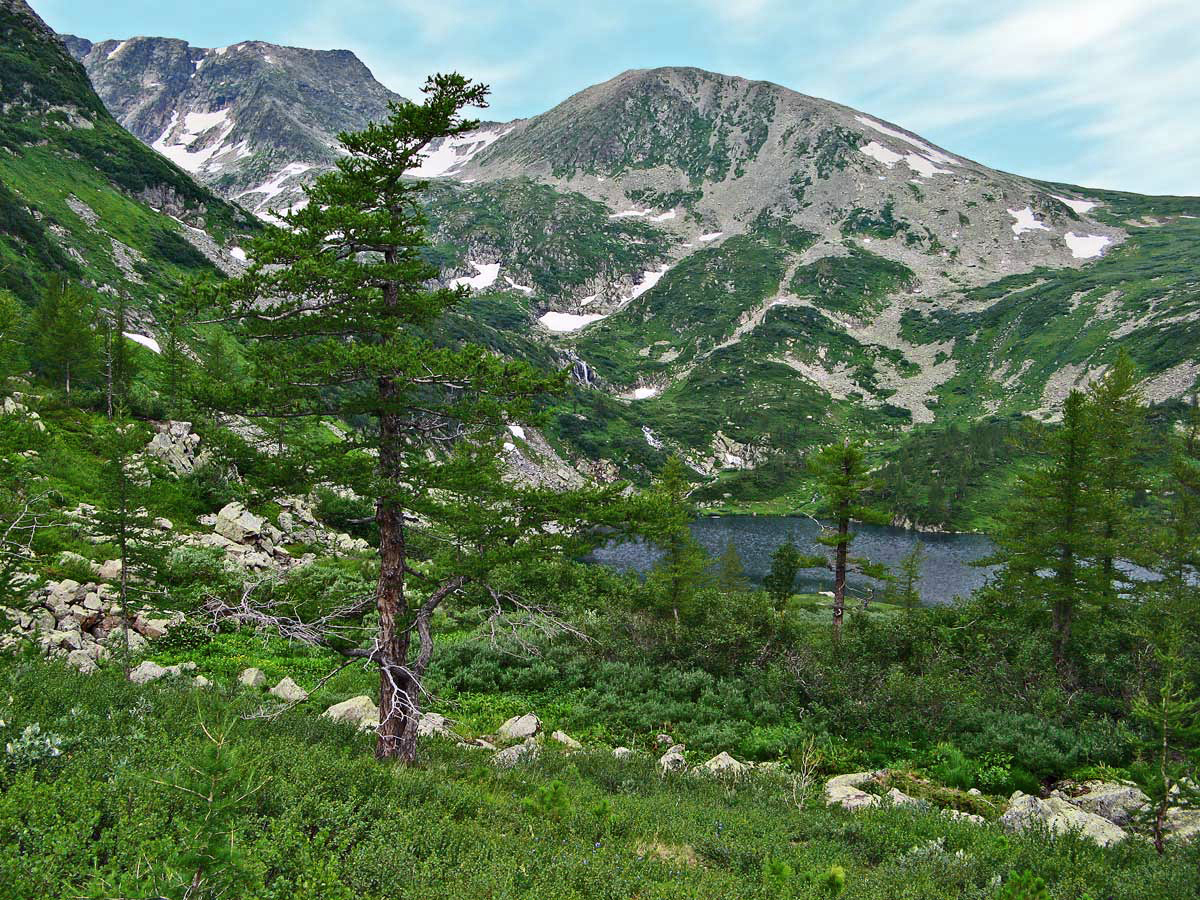
Siberian larch Larix sibirica trees in summer. Kuznetsk Alatau Nature Reserve, Kemerovo Oblast

- Larix sibirica
- Larix gmelinii
- Picea obovata
- Pinus pumila

== Politics ==
=== Notable sovereign states ===
- Xianbei state (1st–3rd century CE)
- First Turkic Khaganate (6th–7th century)
- Eastern Turkic Khaganate (7th century)
- Second Turkic Khaganate (7th–8th century)
- Kyrgyz Khaganate (8th–13th century)
- Mongol Empire (13th–14th century)
- Khanate of Sibir (1468–1598)
- Tsardom of Russia (1598–1721)
- Russian Empire (1721–1917)
- Russian Republic (1917–1918)
- Siberian Republic (1918)
- Russian State (1918–1920)
- Russian Socialist Federative Soviet Republic (1918–1922)
- Far Eastern Republic (1920–1922)
- Tuvan People's Republic (1921–1944)
- Soviet Union (1922–1991)
  - Russian Soviet Federative Socialist Republic (1922–1991)
- Russian Federation (1991–present)

== Borders and administrative division ==
Map of the most populated area of Siberia with clickable city names (SVG)

Comparison of the nine biggest Siberian cities' growth in the 20th century

The term "Siberia" has both a long history and wide significance, and association. The understanding and association of "Siberia" have gradually changed during the ages. Historically, Siberia was defined as the whole part of Russia and North Kazakhstan to the east of Ural Mountains, including the Russian Far East. According to this definition, Siberia extended eastward from the Ural Mountains to the Pacific coast, and southward from the Arctic Ocean to the border of Central Asia and the national borders of both Mongolia and China.

Soviet-era sources (Great Soviet Encyclopedia and others) and modern Russian ones usually define Siberia as a region extending eastward from the Ural Mountains to the watershed between Pacific and Arctic drainage basins, and southward from the Arctic Ocean to the hills of north-central Kazakhstan and the national borders of both Mongolia and China. By this definition, Siberia includes the federal subjects of the Siberian Federal District, and some of the Ural Federal District, as well as Sakha (Yakutia) Republic, which is a part of the Far Eastern Federal District. Geographically, this definition includes subdivisions of several other subjects of Urals and Far Eastern federal districts, but they are not included administratively. This definition excludes Sverdlovsk Oblast and Chelyabinsk Oblast, both of which are included in some wider definitions of Siberia.

Other sources may use either a somewhat wider definition that states the Pacific coast, not the watershed, is the eastern boundary (thus including the whole Russian Far East), as well as all Northern Kazakhstan is its subregion in the south-west or a somewhat narrower one that limits Siberia to the Siberian Federal District (thus excluding all subjects of other districts). In Russian, 'Siberia' is commonly used as a substitute for the name of the federal district by those who live in the district itself, and who residing outside of it. Due to the different interpretations of Siberia, starting from Tyumen, to Chita, the territory generally defined as 'Siberia', some people will define themselves as 'Siberian', while others not.

A number of factors in recent years, including the fomenting of Siberian separatism, have made the definition of the territory of Siberia a potentially controversial subject. In the eastern extent of Siberia there are territories which are not clearly defined as either Siberia or the Far East, making the question of "what is Siberia?" one with no clear answer, and what is a "Siberian", one of self-identification.

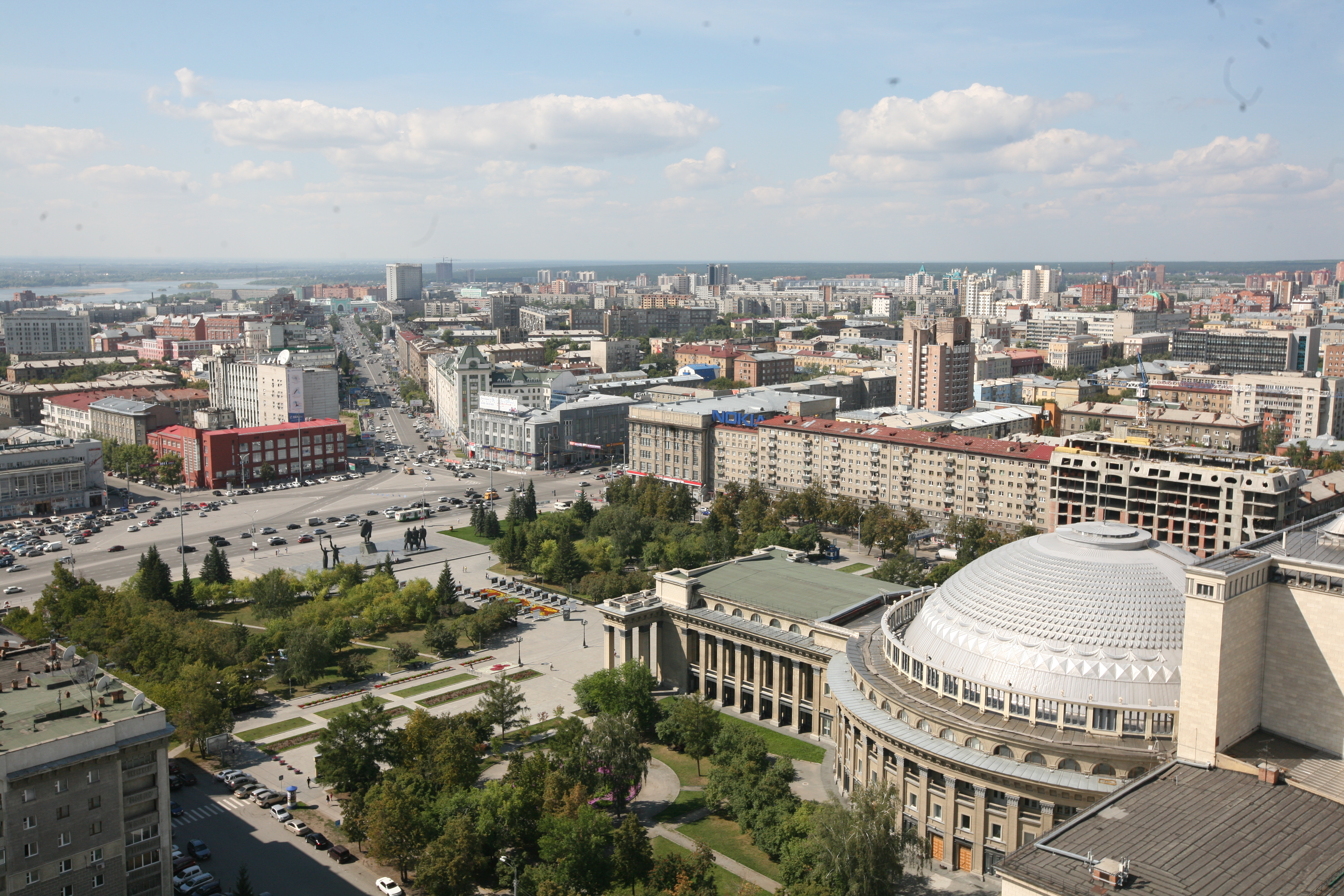
Novosibirsk is the largest city in Siberia.

Federal subjects of Siberia (GSE)
Subject	Administrative center
Ural Federal District
Khanty–Mansi Autonomous Okrug	Khanty-Mansiysk
Kurgan Oblast	Kurgan
Tyumen Oblast	Tyumen
Yamalo-Nenets Autonomous Okrug	Salekhard
Siberian Federal District
Altai Krai	Barnaul
Altai Republic	Gorno-Altaysk
Irkutsk Oblast	Irkutsk
Khakassia	Abakan
Kemerovo Oblast	Kemerovo
Krasnoyarsk Krai	Krasnoyarsk
Novosibirsk Oblast	Novosibirsk
Omsk Oblast	Omsk
Tomsk Oblast	Tomsk
Tuva	Kyzyl
Far Eastern Federal District
Buryatia	Ulan-Ude
Sakha (Yakutia)	Yakutsk
Zabaykalsky Krai	Chita

Amur waterfront in Khabarovsk

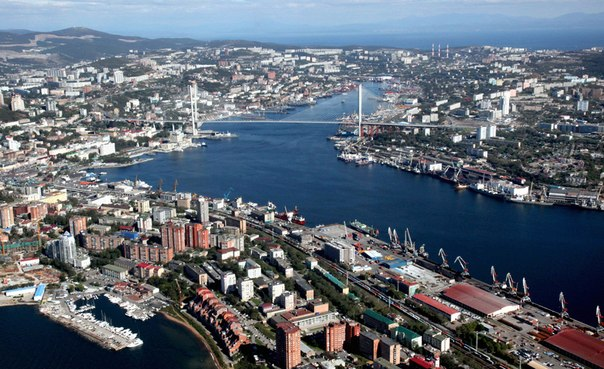
Vladivostok, Primorsky Krai

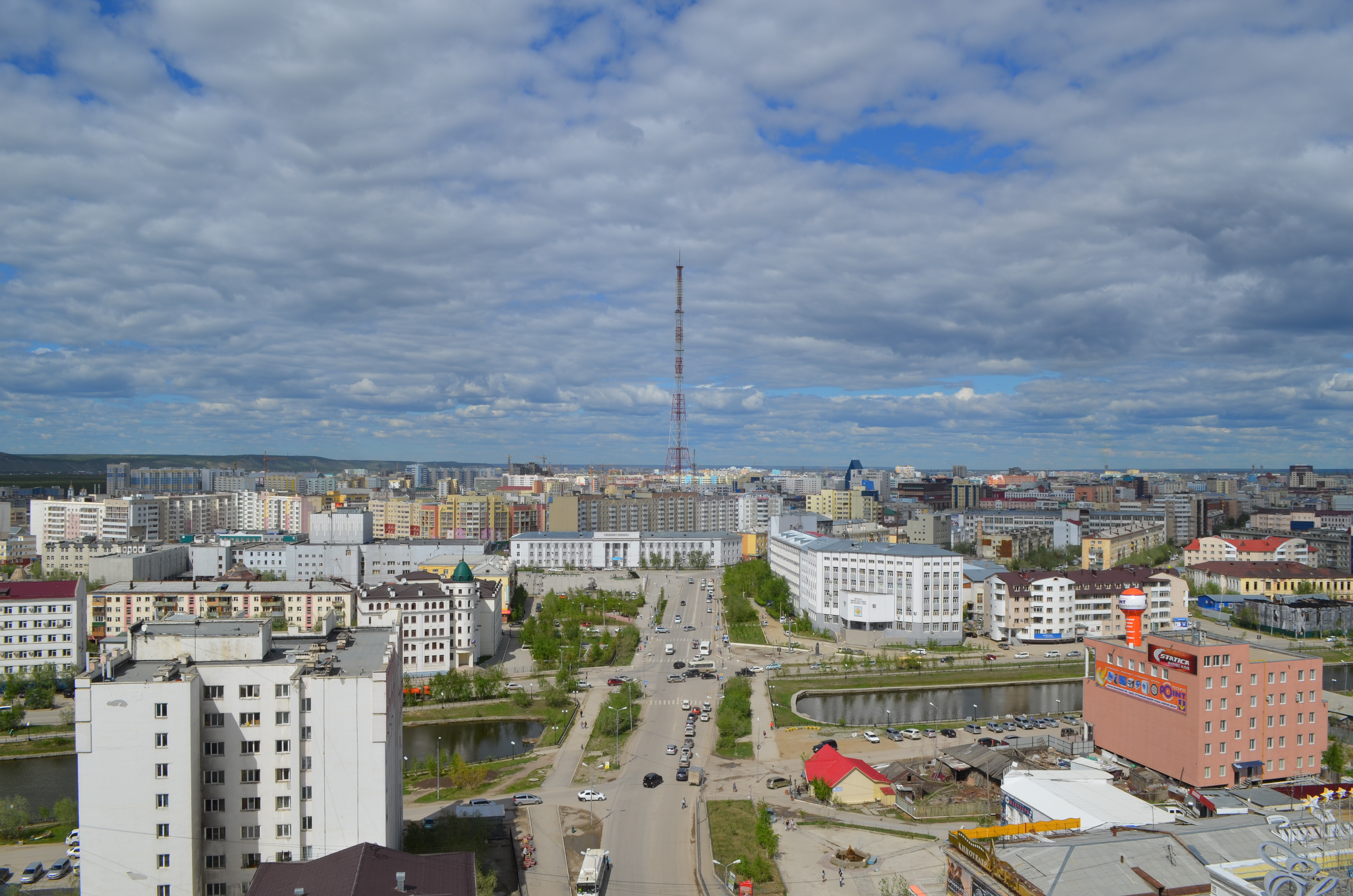
Yakutsk is the capital of the Sakha Republic.

Federal subjects of Siberia (in wide sense)
Subject	Administrative center
Far Eastern Federal District
Amur Oblast	Blagoveshchensk
Chukotka Autonomous Okrug	Anadyr
Jewish Autonomous Oblast	Birobidzhan
Kamchatka Krai	Petropavlovsk-Kamchatsky
Khabarovsk Krai	Khabarovsk
Magadan Oblast	Magadan
Primorsky Krai	Vladivostok
Sakhalin Oblast	Yuzhno-Sakhalinsk
Ural Federal District
Chelyabinsk Oblast	Chelyabinsk
Sverdlovsk Oblast	Yekaterinburg

Red: Administrative unit of Russia - Siberian Federal District 5.1 million km² (~30.09% of the territory of the Russian Federation) Red and orange: Siberia 9.8 million km² (~57.01% of the territory of the Russian Federation) Red orange and yellow: Asian part of Russia (without territory south of the Kuma-Manych depression) 13.1 million km² (~76.69% of the territory of the Russian Federation)

=== Major cities ===
The most populous city of Siberia, as well as the third most populous city of Russia, is Novosibirsk. Present-day Novosibirsk is an important business, science, manufacturing and cultural center of the Asian part of Russia. Omsk played an important role in the Russian Civil War serving as a provisional Russian capital, as well in the expansion into and governing of Central Asia. In addition to its cultural status, it has become a major oil-refining, education, transport and agriculture hub.

Other historic cities of Siberia include Tobolsk (the first capital and the only kremlin in Siberia), Tomsk (formerly a wealthy merchant's town) and Irkutsk (former seat of Eastern Siberia's governor general, near lake Baikal). Other major cities include Barnaul, Kemerovo, Krasnoyarsk, Novokuznetsk, Tyumen. Wider definitions of geographic Siberia also include the cities of Chelyabinsk and Yekaterinburg in the Urals; Khabarovsk and Vladivostok in the Russian Far East; and even Petropavlovsk in Kazakhstan and Harbin in China.

== Economy ==
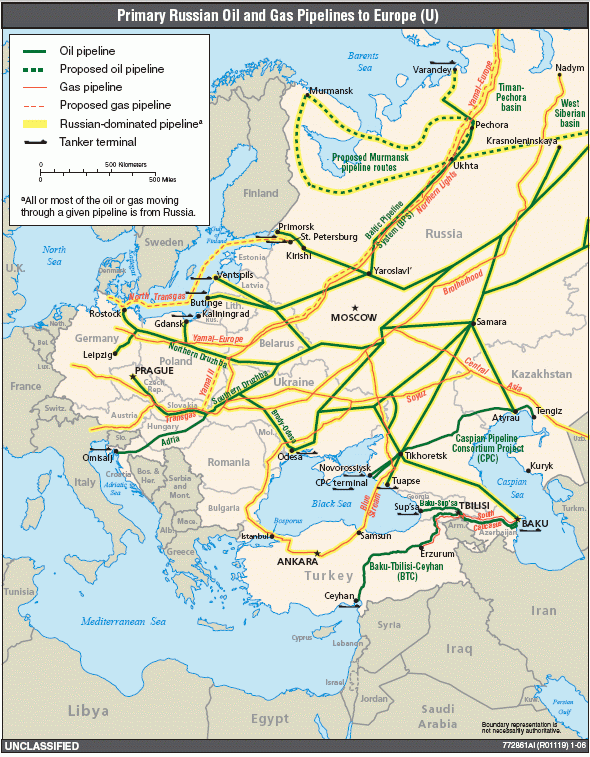
Russian oil and gas pipelines in use

Novosibirsk is the most important city for the Siberian economy; with an extra boost since 2000 when it was designated a regional center for the executive bureaucracy (Siberian Federal District). Russia's largest oil refinery is the Omsk Refinery.

Siberia is extraordinarily rich in minerals, containing ores of almost all economically valuable metals. It has some of the world's largest deposits of nickel, gold, lead, coal, molybdenum, gypsum, diamonds, diopside, silver and zinc, as well as extensive unexploited resources of oil and natural gas. Around 70% of Russia's developed oil fields are in the Khanty-Mansiysk region. Russia contains about 40% of the world's known resources of nickel at the Norilsk deposit in Siberia. Norilsk Nickel is the world's largest nickel and palladium producer.

Siberian agriculture is severely restricted by the short growing season of most of the region. However, in the southwest where soils consist of fertile black earths and the climate is a little more moderate, there is extensive cropping of wheat, barley, rye and potatoes, along with the grazing of large numbers of sheep and cattle. Elsewhere food production, owing to the poor fertility of the podzolic soils and the extremely short growing seasons, is restricted to the herding of reindeer in the tundra—which has been practiced by natives for over 10,000 years.

Siberia has the world's largest forests. Timber remains an important source of revenue, even though many forests in the east have been logged much more rapidly than they are able to recover. The Sea of Okhotsk is one of the two or three richest fisheries in the world owing to its cold currents and very large tidal ranges, and thus Siberia produces over 10% of the world's annual fish catch, although fishing has declined somewhat since the collapse of the USSR in 1991.

Reported in 2009, the development of renewable energy in Russia is held back by the lack of a conducive government policy framework, As of 2011, Siberia offers special opportunities for off-grid renewable energy developments. Remote parts of Siberia are too costly to connect to central electricity and gas grids and have therefore historically been supplied with costly diesel, sometimes flown in by helicopter. In such cases renewable energy is often cheaper.

== Sport ==
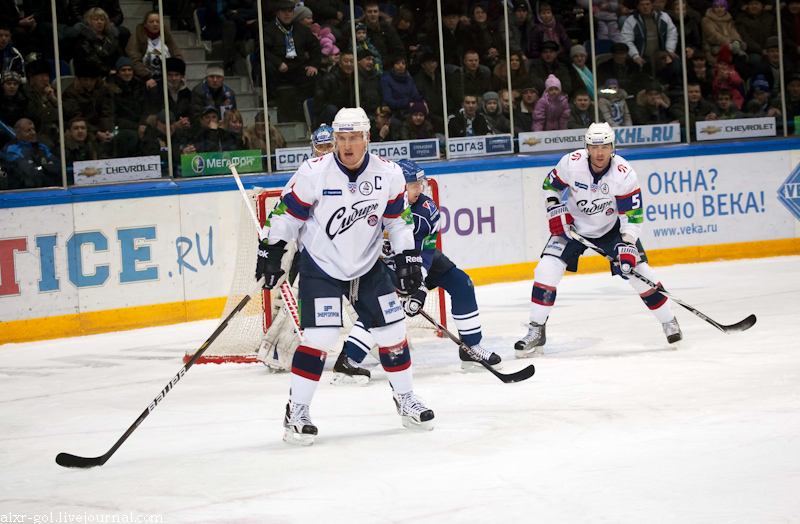
KHL game HC Sibir Novosibirsk vs Amur Khabarovsk

Russia's third most popular sport, bandy, is important in Siberia. In the 2015–16 Russian Bandy Super League season Yenisey from Krasnoyarsk became champions for the third year in a row by beating Baykal-Energiya from Irkutsk in the final. Two or three more teams (depending on the definition of Siberia) play in the Super League, the 2016–17 champions SKA-Neftyanik from Khabarovsk as well as Kuzbass from Kemerovo and Sibselmash from Novosibirsk. In 2007 Kemerovo got Russia's first indoor arena specifically built for bandy. Now Khabarovsk has the world's largest indoor arena specifically built for bandy, Arena Yerofey. It was venue for Division A of the 2018 World Championship. In time for the 2020 World Championship, an indoor arena will be ready for use in Irkutsk. That one will also have a speed skating oval.

Krasnoyarsk is one of the centres of rugby in Russia, with 2 of the largest clubs in the country, STM Enisei and Krasny Yar, are both based in the city. The Yenisey Krasnoyarsk basketball team has played in the VTB United League since 2011–12. The 2019 Winter Universiade was hosted by Krasnoyarsk.

== Demographics ==
Population of Siberia
Ethnicity	Population	%
Slavic	18,235,471	86.2%
Turkic	1,704,665	8.1%
Mongolic	454,312	2.1%
Uralic	131,430	0.6%
Other	637,992	3.0%

Historical population
Year	Pop.	±%
1959	30,759,112	—
1970	30,758,745	−0.0%
1979	36,901,468	+20.0%
1989	41,544,390	+12.6%
2002	39,129,729	−5.8%
2010	37,631,081	−3.8%
2021	37,077,502	−1.5%
2025	36,635,909	−1.2%
Historical population of the Ural, Siberian and Far Eastern federal districts

According to the Russian Census of 2010, the Siberian and Far Eastern Federal Districts, together have a population of about 25.6 million. Tyumen and Kurgan Oblasts, which are geographically in Siberia but administratively part of the Urals Federal District, together have a population of about 4.3 million. Thus, the whole region of Siberia (in the broadest usage of the term) is home to approximately 30 million people. It has a population density of about three people per square kilometre.

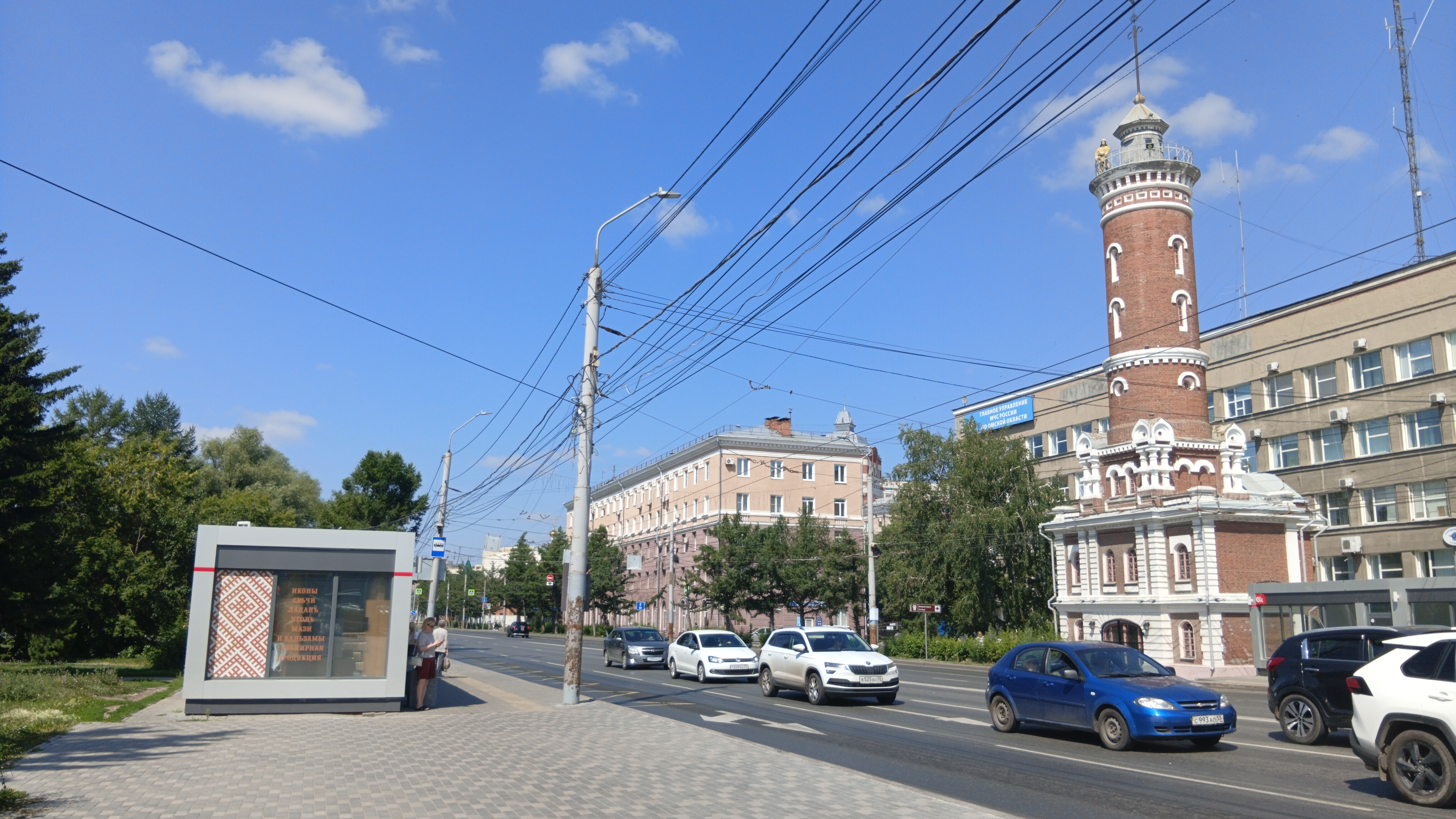
Omsk, the third largest city in Siberia

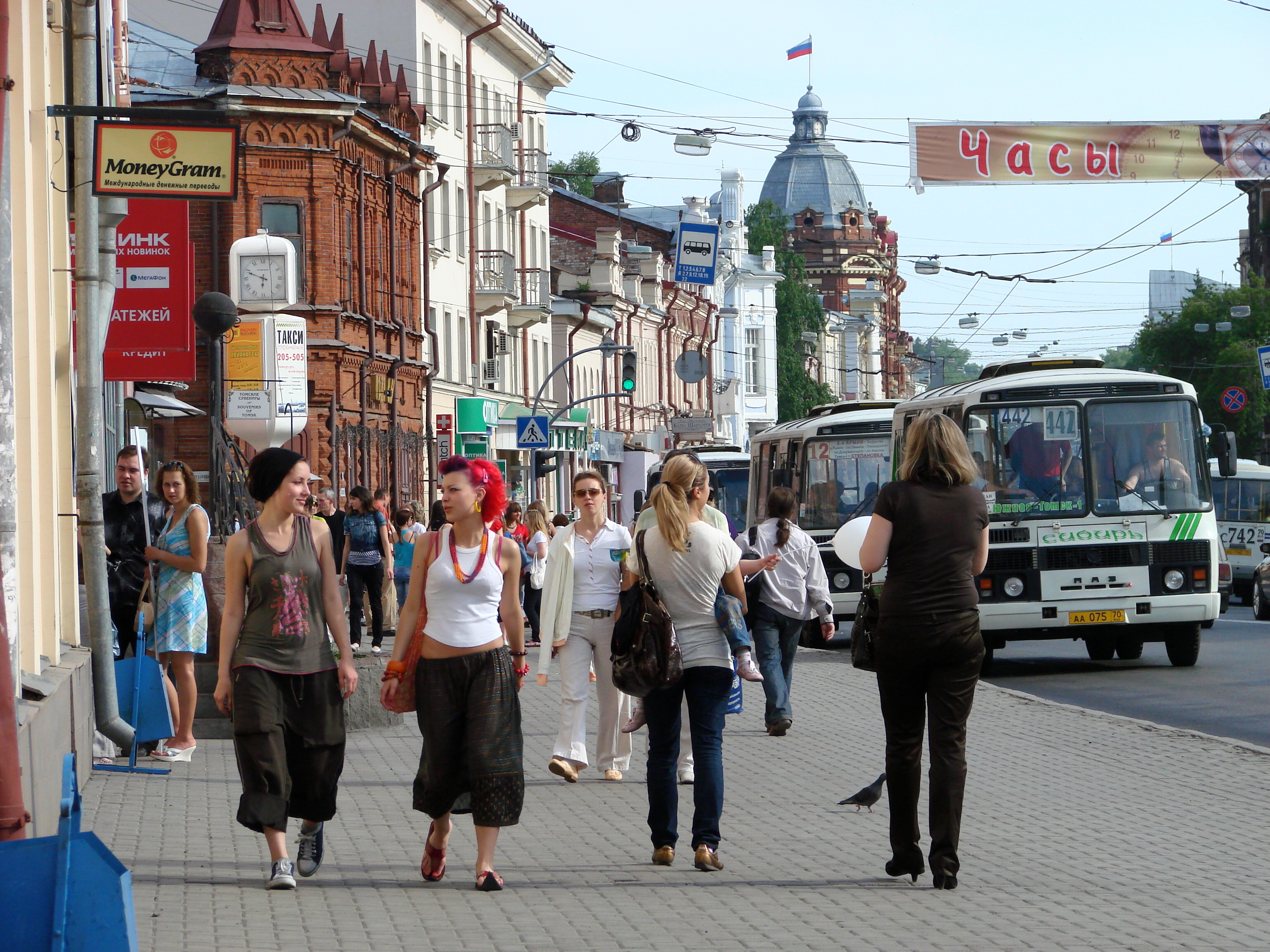
Tomsk, one of the oldest Siberian cities, founded in 1604

The largest ethnic group in Siberia is Slavic-origin Russians, including their sub-ethnic group Siberians, and russified Ukrainians. Slavic and other Indo-European ethnicities make up the vast majority (over 85%) of the Siberian population. There are also other groups of indigenous Siberian and non-indigenous ethnic origin. A minority of the current population are descendants of Mongol or Turkic people (mainly Buryats, Yakuts, Tuvans, Altai and Khakas) or northern indigenous people. Slavic-origin Russians outnumber all of the indigenous peoples combined, except in the Republics of Tuva and Sakha.

According to the 2002 census there are 500,000 Tatars in Siberia, but of these, 300,000 are Volga Tatars who also settled in Siberia during periods of colonization and are thus also non-indigenous Siberians, in contrast to the 200,000 Siberian Tatars which are indigenous to Siberia. Of the indigenous Siberians, the Mongol-speaking Buryats, numbering approximately 500,000, are the most numerous group in Siberia, and they are mainly concentrated in their homeland, the Buryat Republic. According to the 2010 census there were 478,085 indigenous Turkic-speaking Yakuts. Other ethnic groups indigenous to Siberia include Kets, Evenks, Chukchis, Koryaks, Yupiks, and Yukaghirs.

About 70% of Siberia's people live in cities, mainly in apartments. Many people also live in rural areas, in simple, spacious, log houses.

== Religion ==
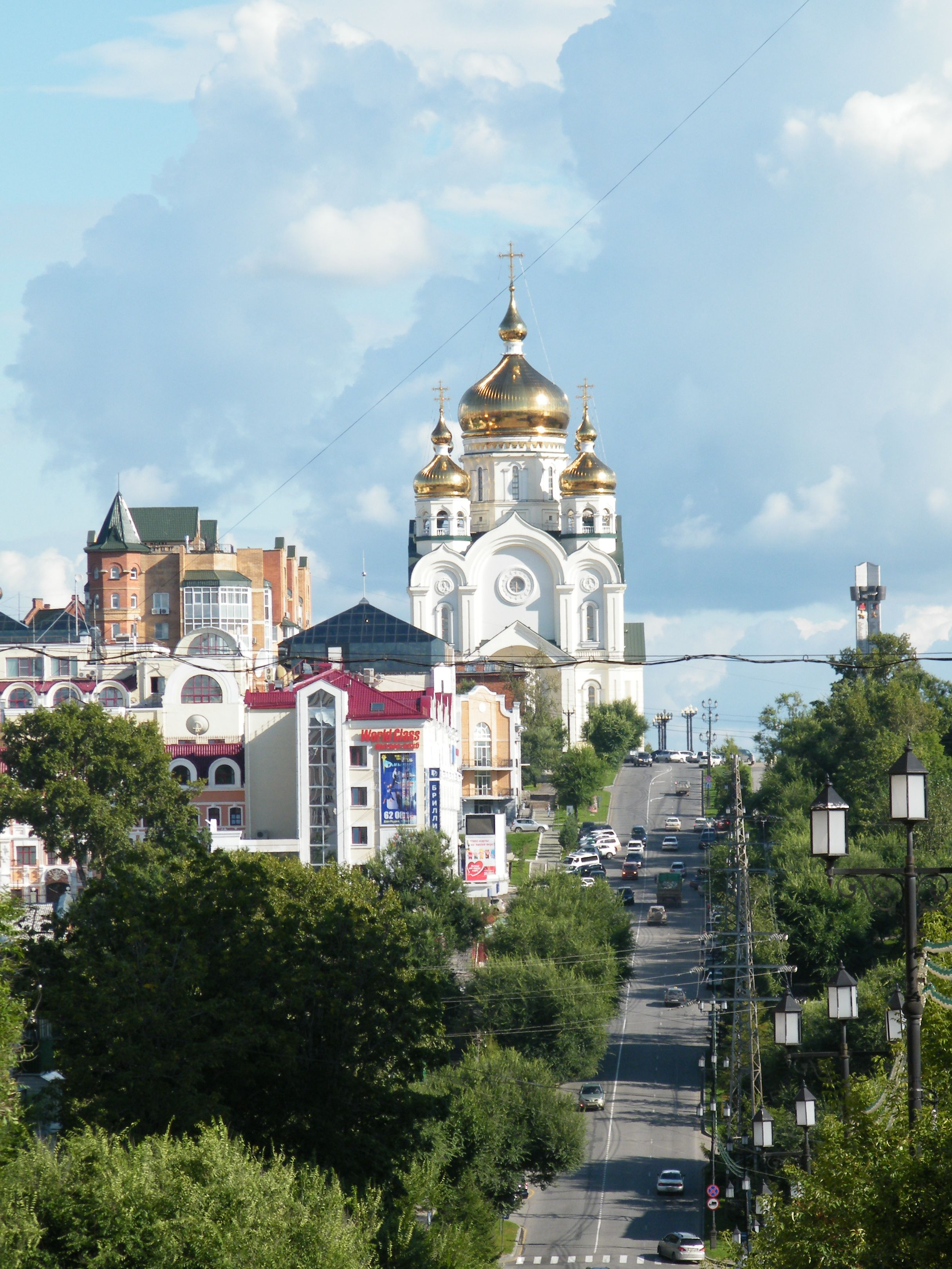
Transfiguration Cathedral, Khabarovsk

There are a variety of beliefs throughout Siberia, including Orthodox Christianity, other denominations of Christianity, Tibetan Buddhism and Islam. The Siberian Federal District has an estimated 250,000 Muslims. An estimated 70,000 Jews live in Siberia, some in the Jewish Autonomous Region. The predominant religious group is the Russian Orthodox Church.

Tradition regards Siberia the archetypal home of shamanism, and polytheism is popular. These native sacred practices are considered by the tribes to be very ancient. There are records of Siberian tribal healing practices dating back to the 13th century. The vast territory of Siberia has many different local traditions of gods. These include: Ak Ana, Anapel, Bugady Musun, Kara Khan, Khaltesh-Anki, Kini'je, Ku'urkil, Nga, Nu'tenut, Num-Torum, Pon, Pugu, Todote, Toko'yoto, Tomam, Xaya Iccita and Zonget. Places with sacred areas include Olkhon, an island in Lake Baikal.

== Transport ==
Many cities in northern Siberia, such as Petropavlovsk-Kamchatsky, cannot be reached by road, as there are virtually none connecting from other major cities in Russia or Asia. Siberia can be reached through the Trans-Siberian Railway, which operates from Moscow in the west to Vladivostok in the east. Cities that are located far from the railway are reached by air or by the separate Baikal–Amur Railway.

== Culture ==
Stroganina is a raw fish dish of the indigenous people of northern Arctic Siberia made from raw, thin, long-sliced frozen fish. It is a popular dish amongst native Siberians. Siberia is known for its pelmeni dumpling; in the winter, the dumplings are traditionally frozen and stored outdoors. There are various berry, nut and mushroom dishes making use of the riches of abundant nature.

== See also ==
- Siberian regionalism
- Tunguska Basin

== Bibliography ==
- "Сибирь" . Brockhaus and Efron Encyclopedic Dictionary (in Russian). 1906.
- Baievsky, Borris; Squire, E.C. (30 June 1926), "Siberia Its Resources and Possibilities", United States Department of Commerce Bureau of Foreign and Domestic Commerce, Trade Promotion Series No. 36, Washington, DC: Government Printing Office
- Batalden, Stephen K. (1997). The Newly Independent States of Eurasia: Handbook of Former Soviet Republics. Contributor: Sandra L. Batalden (revised ed.). Greenwood Publishing Group. ISBN 978-0-89774-940-4.
- Black, Jeremy (2008). War and the World: Military Power and the Fate of Continents, 1450–2000. Yale University Press. ISBN 978-0-300-14769-8.
- Bobrick, Benson. East of the Sun: the epic conquest and tragic history of Siberia (Henry Holt and Company, 1993); popular history
- Condé Nast's Traveler, Volume 36. Condé Nast Publications. 2001.
- Diment, Galya, and Yuri Slezkine, eds. Between Heaven and Hell: The Myth of Siberia in Russian Culture (3rd ed. 1993)
- Forsyth, James (1994). A History of the Peoples of Siberia: Russia's North Asian Colony 1581–1990 (Illustrated, reprint, revised ed.). Cambridge University Press. ISBN 978-0-521-47771-0.
- Forsyth, James. A History of the Peoples of Siberia: Russia's North Asian Colony, 1581–1990 (Cambridge, Cambridge University Press, 1994).
- Yearbook. International Work Group for Indigenous Affairs. 1992.
- Kotkin, Stephen, and David Wolff, eds. (1995). Rediscovering Russia in Asia.
- Kropotkin, Peter Alexeivitch; Bealby, John Thomas (1911). "Siberia" . In Chisholm, Hugh (ed.). Encyclopædia Britannica. Vol. 25 (11th ed.). Cambridge University Press. pp. 10–18.
- Lincoln, W. Bruce (1993) The Conquest of a Continent. Scholarly history.
- Mote, Victor L. (1998). Siberia: Worlds Apart. Westview series on the post-Soviet republics (illustrated ed.). Westview Press. ISBN 978-0-8133-1298-9.
- Naumov, Igor V. (22 November 2006). The History of Siberia. Routledge. ISBN 978-1-134-20703-9.
- Pesterev, V. (2015). Siberian frontier: the territory of fear. Royal Geographical Society (with IBG), London.
- Samoylova, G. S. (2015). "Сибирь". Большая Российская энциклопедия. Том 30: Сен-Жерменский мир 1679 — Социальное обеспечение (in Russian). Большая Российская энциклопедия. pp. 135–136. ISBN 978-5-85270-367-5. Archived from the original on 26 April 2026.
- Stephan, John J. (1996). The Russian Far East: A History (Illustrated, reprint ed.). Stanford University Press. ISBN 978-0-8047-2701-3.
- Wood, Alan (1 January 1991). The History of Siberia: From Russian Conquest to Revolution. Routledge. ISBN 978-0-415-05873-5.
- Wood, Alan (2011). Russia's Frozen Frontier: A History of Siberia and the Russian Far East 1581–1991 (illustrated ed.). A&C Black. ISBN 978-0-340-97124-6.
