= Kini'je =

Kini'je is a Yukaghir deity responsible for the flow of time.
