= Xaya Iccita =

Yakut god of mountains

Xaya Iccita is the Yakut god of mountains, or "mountain owner".
