= Todote =

Todote is the Samoyed god of evil and death, identified with the Turkic god Erlik. He lives underground and has his servant-demons Amuke bring him people to consume. The other gods (supreme), Nga (god) and Dia-menyuo, who weaves the book of destines, decide who he will eat. Some versions of myth claim that the two are parents of Todote. It was believed that a person died when Todote blew his breath into a person.
