= Roman Charity =

Ancient story

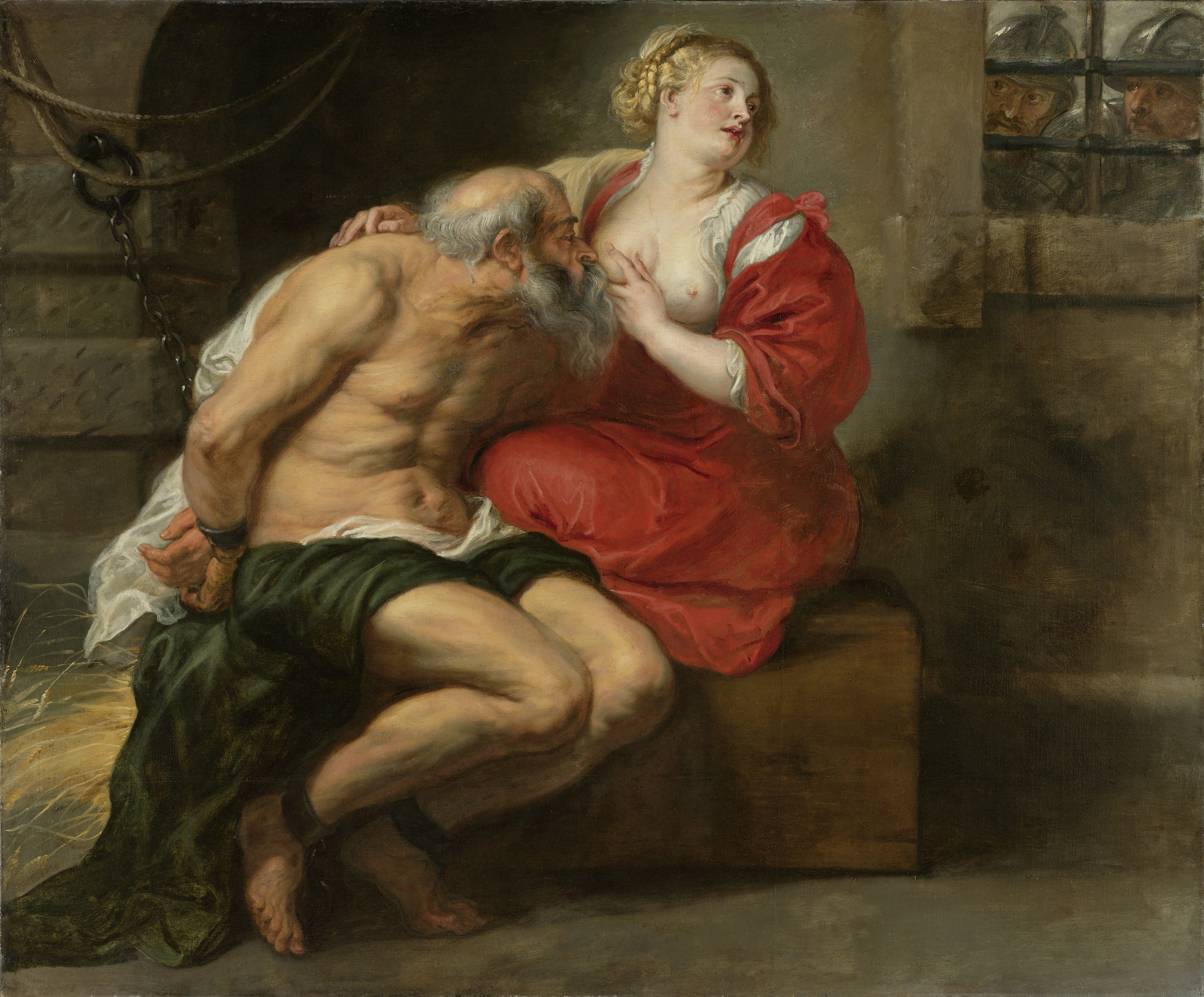
Cimon and Pero, Rubens (c.1625)

Roman Charity (Latin: Caritas Romana; Italian: Carità Romana) or Cimon and Pero is an ancient Greek and Roman exemplary story (exemplum) of filial piety (pietas) in which a woman secretly breastfeeds her father or mother, incarcerated and supposedly sentenced to death by starvation. Once caught, the loving devotion shown so moves the authorities that she is forgiven and the parent is typically freed. The father in the story is often named Cimon (Ancient Greek: Κίμων, Kímōn) and the daughter Pero, although other versions name the father Mycon (Μύκον, Mýkon). First attested in surviving Roman sources, it became a common theme in Early Modern period of Western European art, particularly the Baroque period.

== History ==
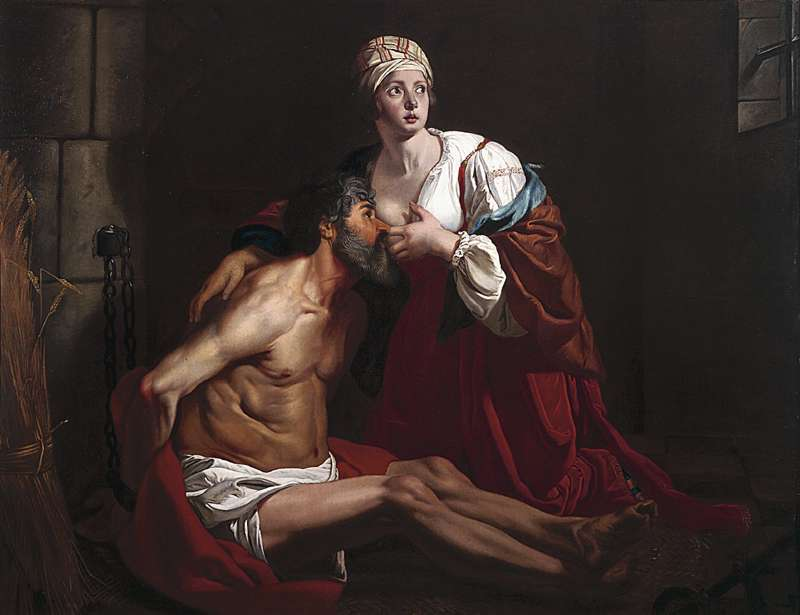
Caritas Romana, Gaspar de Crayer (c. 1645)

The story is recorded in the Factorum ac Dictorum Memorabilium Libri IX ("Nine Books of Memorable Deeds and Sayings") by the ancient Roman historian Valerius Maximus and was presented as a great act of pietas (i.e., filial piety) and Roman honour. Additionally, wall paintings and terracotta statues from the first century excavated in Pompeii suggest that visual representations of Pero and Cimon were common, however it is difficult to say whether these existed in response to Maximus's anecdote or preceded – inspired – his story. Among Romans, the theme had mythological echoes in Juno's breastfeeding of the adult Hercules, an Etruscan myth.

Maximus's anecdote of Pero and Cimon posits the following ekphrastic challenge:

Men's eyes are riveted in amazement when they see the painting of this act and renew the features of the long bygone incident in astonishment at the spectacle now before them, believing that in those silent outlines of limbs they see living and breathing bodies. This must needs happen to the mind also, admonished to remember things long past as though they were recent by painting, which is considerably more effective than literary memorials.

The mid-1st century Natural History of Pliny the Elder includes the story in its section on the greatest examples of human affection known. In his version, a jailed plebeian woman was nursed by her daughter, who had just given birth and was searched for any food at each visit by the guard. Finally caught, the affection is so moving that the mother was freed and the family provided for out of public funds for the rest of their lives. In some versions, while the guard does hesitate and wonder if perhaps what he saw was against nature (an act of lesbianism), he concludes that in fact it is an example of the first law of nature, which is to love one's own parents.

== Subject in art ==
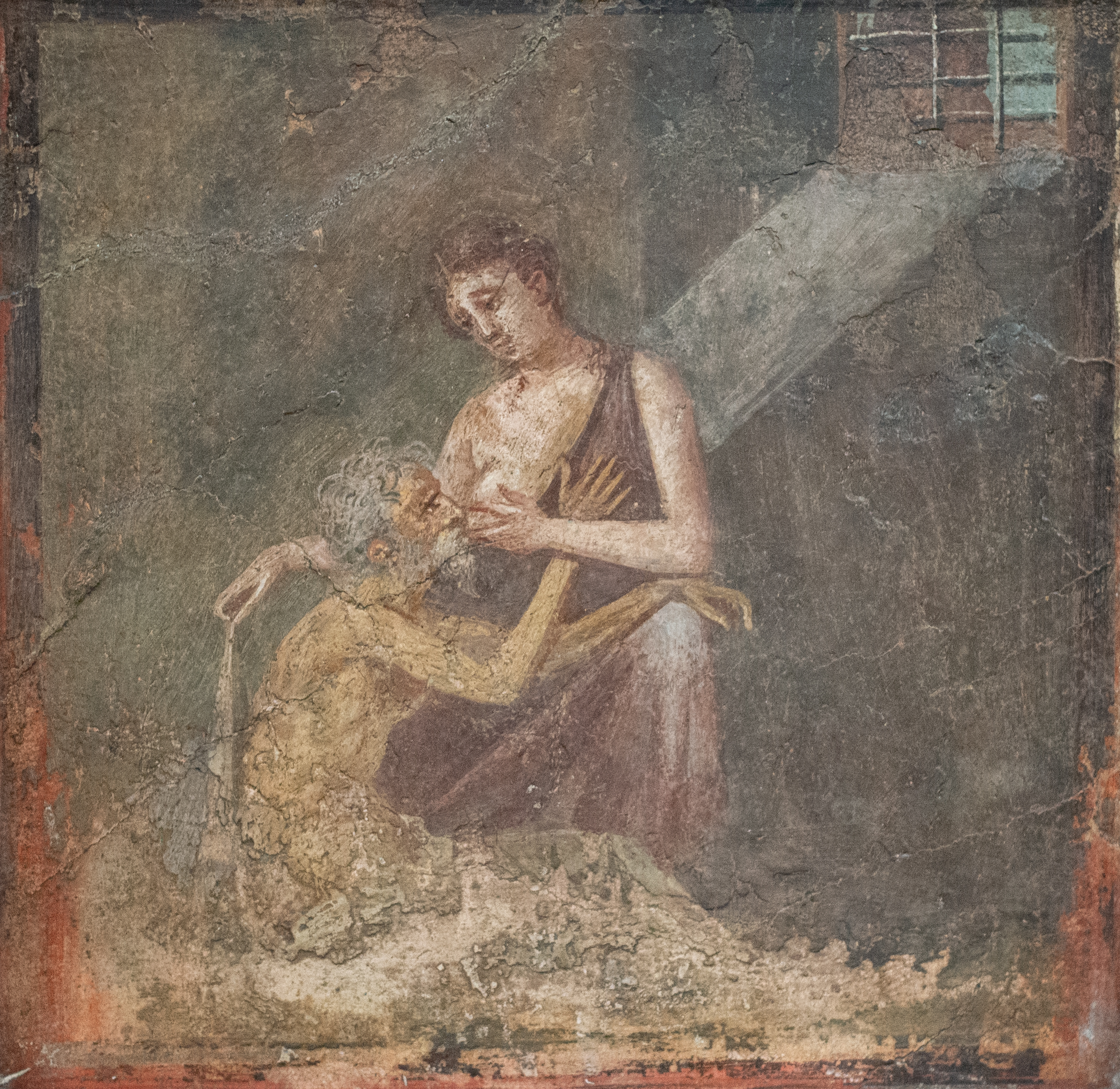
Fresco from Pompeii

=== Early depictions in Germany and Italy ===
The motif appeared in both its mother-daughter and father-daughter variety, although the cross-gendered version was ultimately more popular. The earliest modern depictions of Pero and Cimon emerged independently of each other in Southern Germany and Northern Italy around 1525, in a wide range of media including bronze medals, frescoes, engravings, drawings, oil paintings, ceramics, inlaid wood decorations, and statues.

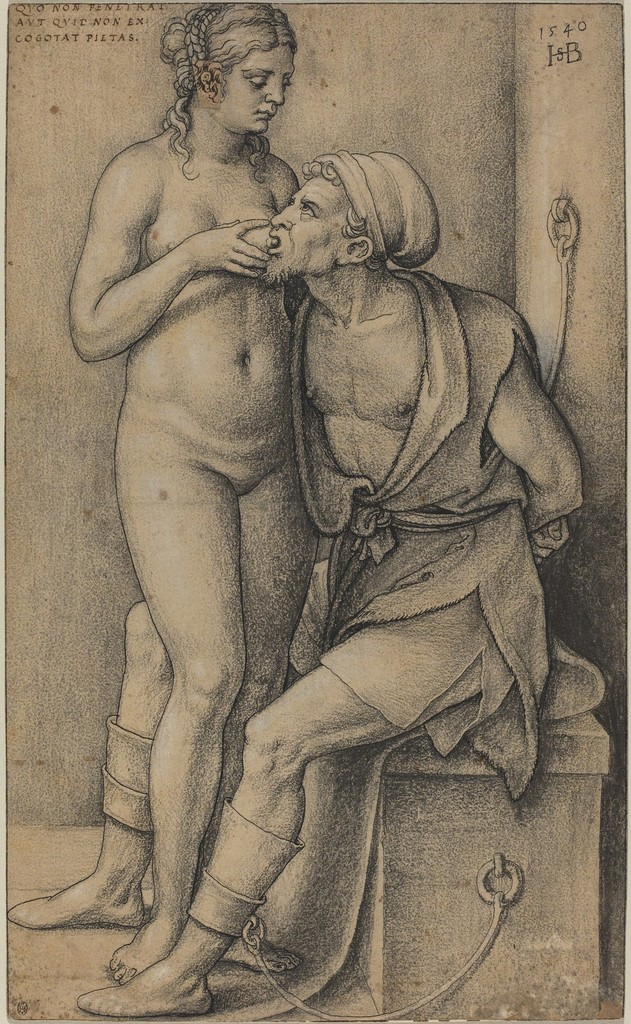
Engraving by Sebald Beham, 1540

In Germany, the brothers Barthel Beham (1502–40) and Sebald Beham (1500–50) produced between them six different renderings of Pero and Cimon. Barthel's first rendering of the theme in 1525 is usually brought in connection with a brief jail term that he, his brother Sebald, and their common friend Georg Pencz served for charges of atheism earlier that year. Barthel's brother Sebald would reissue this print in reverse in 1544, this time with two inscriptions informing the viewer of the father's identity ("Czinmon") and of the meaning of this act: "I live off the breast of my daughter." Sebald himself would revisit the motif twice in his youth between 1526 and 1530, and again in 1540. The print from 1540 is almost ten times bigger than most of the Beham brothers' other art works (ca. 40 x 25 cm) and openly pornographic. Cimon's arms tied are behind his back and his shoulders and lower body are covered in a jacket-like piece of cloth, however his muscular chest and erect nipples are on full display. Pero stands between Cimon's knees, completely naked, her hair is undone and her pubic region and stomach are shaved. She offers him her left breast with a V-hold. An inscription made to look like a scratching into the wall reads: Whither does Piety not penetrate, what does she not devise?

Later in the sixteenth century German artists began depicting the scene in oil paintings, often choosing the classicizing half-length format, thereby drawing of formal analogies between Pero and ancient heroines and including Pero within the genre of the "strong woman", similar to Lucretia, Dido, and Cleopatra or Judith, Salome, and Delilah. Examples of these works include Georg Pencz's version from 1538, Erhard Schwetzer's depiction from the same year, Pencz's version (housed in Stockholm) from 1546, and one by the so-called Master with the Griffin’s Head executed as well in 1546.

Italian oil paintings of the motif existed as early as 1523, when a notary described a painting in possession of the recently deceased Pietro Luna, as "a large canvas in a gilded frame with a woman who nurses an old man". A similar painting is described by a notary for the house of Benedetti di Franciscis in 1538. Still another painting is listed, correctly identified as a daughter nursing her father, by a notary in the estate of miniaturist Gasparo Segizzi. Unfortunately, none of these paintings are still extant.

=== Influences from Caravaggio and Rubens ===
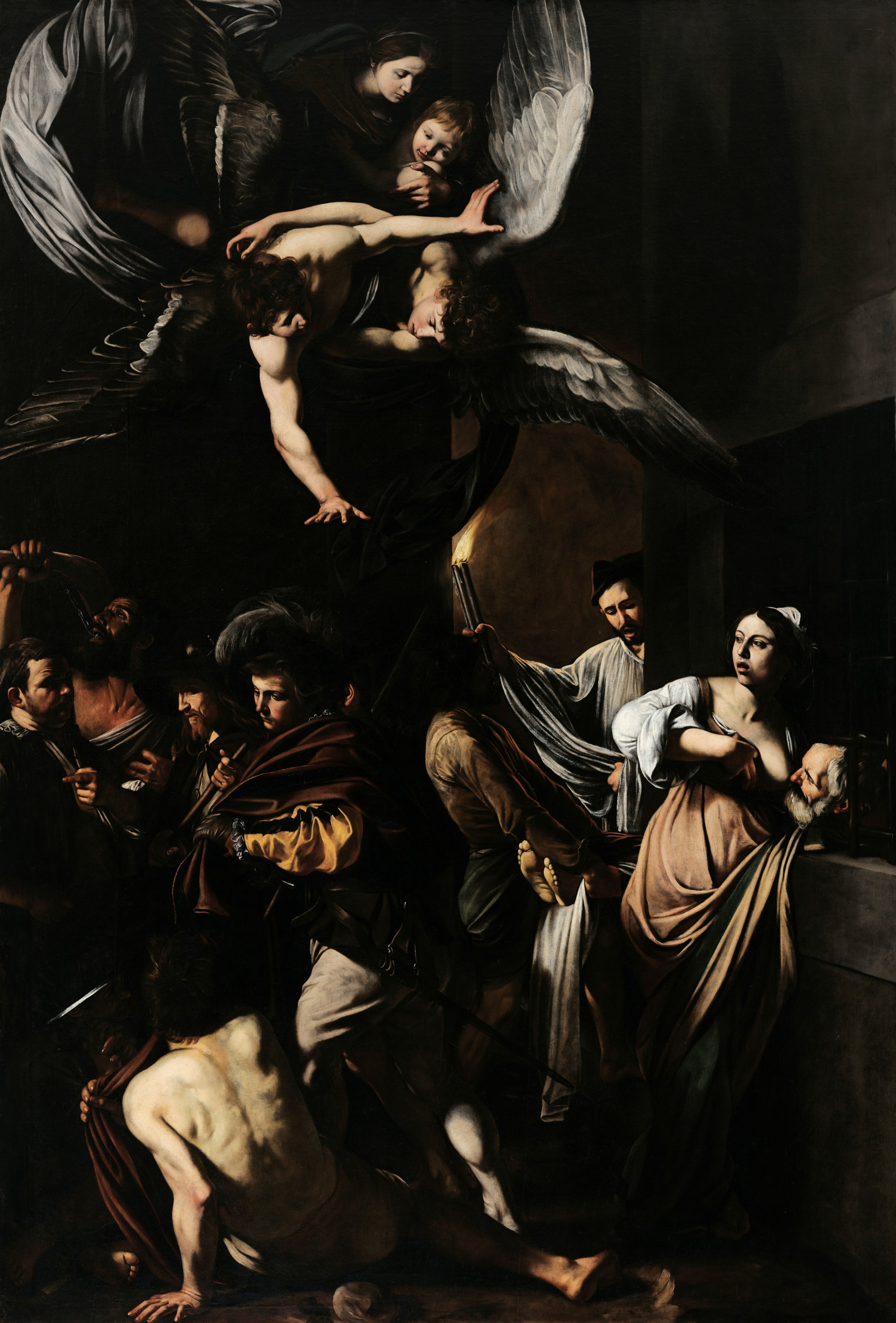
Caravaggio, The Seven Works of Mercy, c. 1606

In 1606/1607, the early Baroque artist Caravaggio featured the scene in his altarpiece, The Seven Works of Mercy, commissioned by the confraternity of Pio Monte della Misericordia in Naples. With regards to his choice of iconography, Caravaggio may have been inspired by his predecessor Perino del Vaga, whose fresco of Roman Charity he could have seen during his stay in Genoa in 1605. Following Caravaggio's altarpiece, the veritable craze for gallery paintings of Pero and Cimon started in 1610–12, and spread through Italy, France, the Southern Netherlands, and Utrecht, even drawing traction among Spanish painters such as Jusepe de Ribera and, later, Bartolomé Esteban Murillo. Given the fact that no gallery painting pre-dates 1610, Caravaggio's altarpiece must have inspired a fad that would last another two centuries. Despite this, the subject matter as one favored by many Caravaggisti has historically been overlooked. Utrecht Caravaggisti, Gerrit van Honthorst, and Abraham Bloemaert both painted versions of the scene, as did Manfredi. Additionally, nine examples of Roman Charity were apparently produced by Caravaggio's noted and outspoken foe, Guido Reni (1575 – 1625) and his workshop.

Peter Paul Rubens and his followers are known to have painted at least three versions. Followers of Ruben's tended to copy his 1630 version (now in Amsterdam) but began introducing a sleeping child at Pero's feet, a detail the original legend does not mention. This element was introduced in the 17th century in order to prevent an interpretation that there was something incestuous about the deed – although the existence of a child is implicit in any case, since the woman is lactating. At the same time, the inclusion of the infant added a new level of meaning to the story as the three figures would represent the three generations and could therefore also be interpreted as an allegory of the three ages of man. Many examples of paintings, prints, and sculptures of Roman Charity include a baby or pre-school-age child (perhaps in the vein of the boy included in Poussin's The Gathering of the Manna), by artists such as Niccolò̀ Tornioli (1598–1651), Cecco Bravo (1607–61), Artus Quellinus the Elder (1609–1668), Louis Boullogne (1609–74), Jean Cornu (1650-1710), Johann Carl Loth (1632–98), Carlo Cignani (1628–1719), Adrian van der Werff (1659–1722), Gregorio Lazzarini (1657–1730), Francesco Migliori (1684–1734), and Johann Peter Weber (1737-1804).

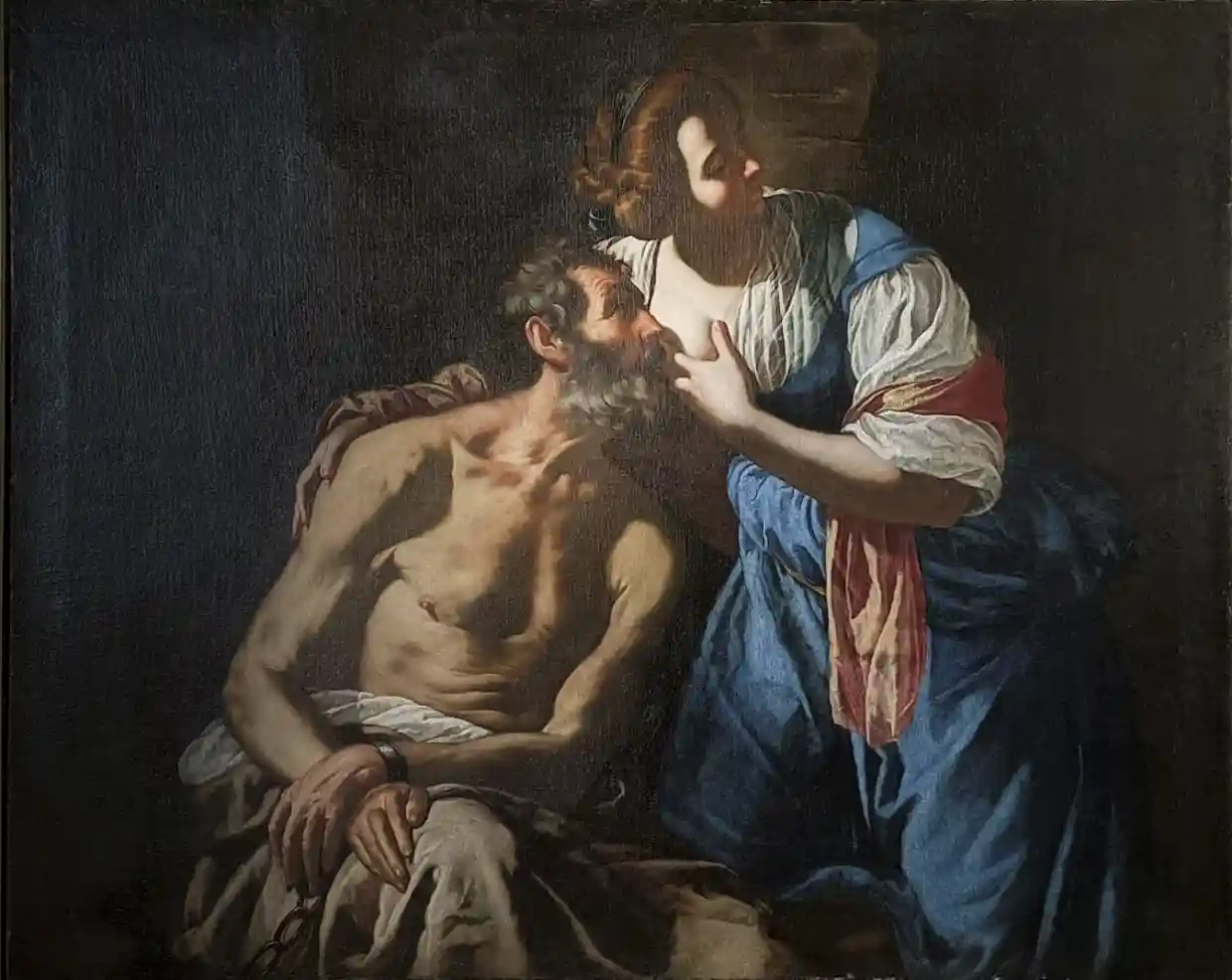
Version by Artemisia Gentileschi (17th-century)

A version by Artemisia Gentileschi is notable in that the artist was a woman.

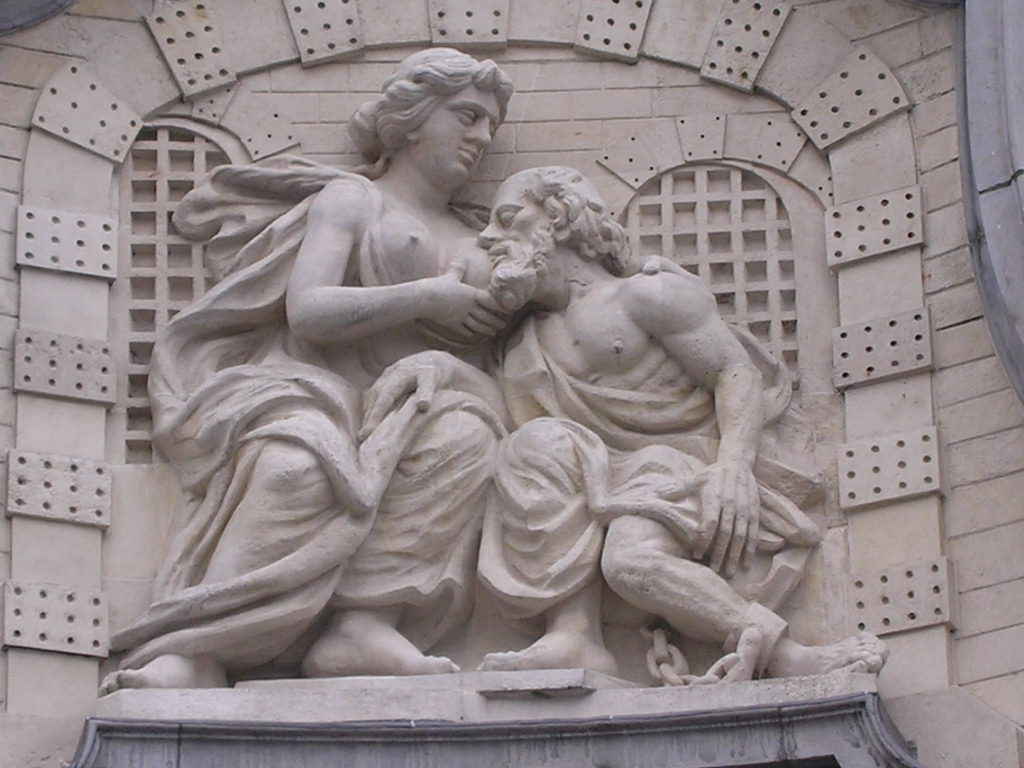
Mammelokker, Belfry of Ghent

A small annex to the Belfry of Ghent dating from 1741, including a sculpture of Roman Charity poised high above the front doorway. It is referred to as "mammelokker", which translates from Dutch as 'breast sucker'.

== Mother-daughter version ==
During this period of prolific engagement with the imagery of Pero and Cimon, Nicolas Poussin (1594–1665) stands out because of his rendering of the breastfeeding mother-daughter couple in The Gathering of the Manna (1639). Poussin's choice of subject matter demonstrated his knowledge of Maximus's other example of filial piety, as well as earlier French renderings of the theme. It is possible that Poussin was familiar with the print by Étienne Delaune (1518/19–88) and/or, perhaps, the "Histoire Rommaine" printed in Lyon in 1548, in which a mother begs her daughter to let her nurse at her breast – a request the daughter rebukes, challenging her mother to display greater dignity in her suffering, before ultimately succumbing and allowing her mother to suckle.

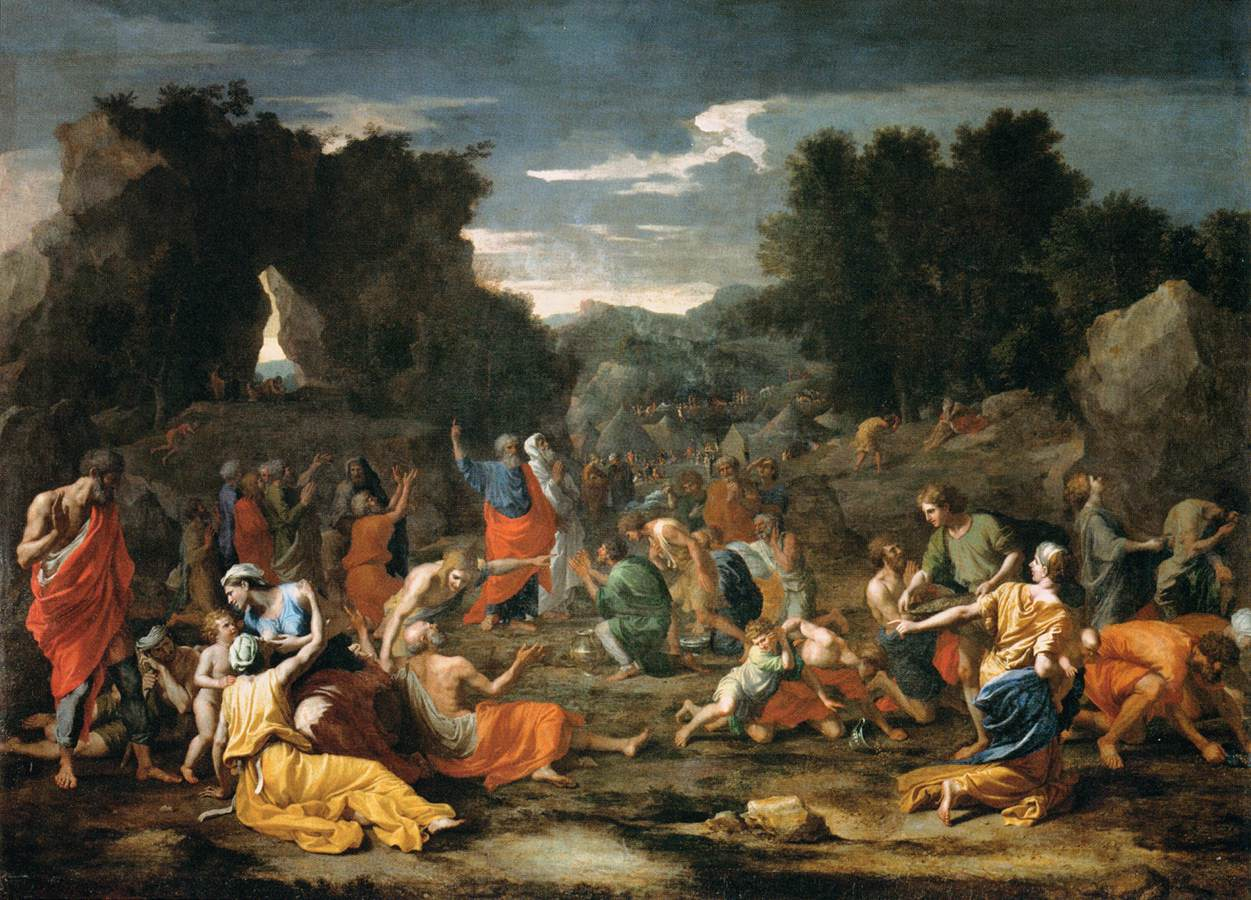
Poussin, The Gathering of the Manna in the Desert, c.1639

Similar to later depictions of Pero and Cimon, which contain the addition of Pero's child in order to dissuade any incestuous or salacious readings, Poussin includes the daughter's son, who competes with his grandmother for his mother's milk. In doing so, and in adding an observer whose reaction belays the correct reading of the scene as one of filial piety, Poussin preempts the potential reading of the scene as lesbian – harkening back to the debate Maximus proposes between the onlooking guards. Despite the fact that Poussin positioned himself as the opposite of Caravaggio, he, like his rival, integrated Maximus's story into a complex religious painting.

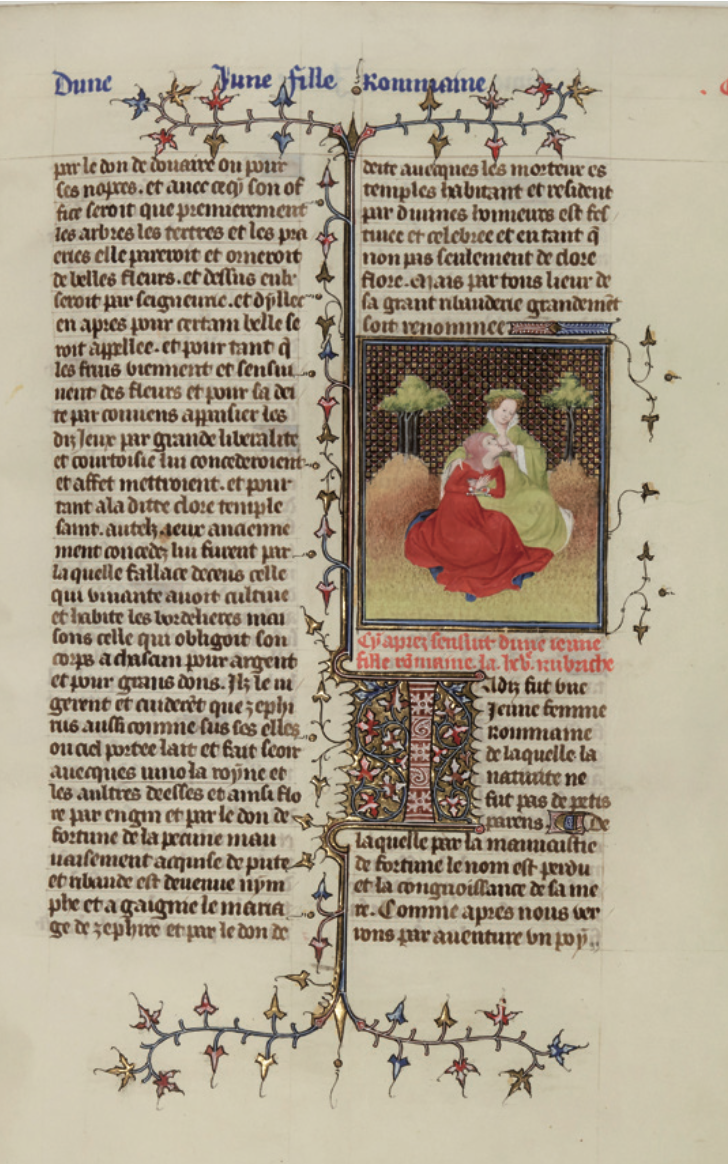
Giovanni Boccaccio (c. 1402)

While the choice to depict the mother-daughter scene as opposed to that of Pero and Cimon was unique at the time that Poussin was painting, the same-sex version enjoyed wider popularity than the father-daughter scene during the Middle Ages and into the early modern period. The medieval work Girard de Rossillon, by an anonymous, tells the story of the imprisoned mother, nursed by her daughter but embellishes it, inventing a name for the daughter – bone Berte – and a noble lineage for the family. In the fourteenth and fifteenth centuries, writers Giovanni Boccaccio (1313–75) and Christine de Pizan (1364-1430) both used the story of the Roman daughter as a story of reciprocal kinship relations. In the sixteenth century Hans Sachs produced an eroticized work on the scene.

Few works depicting the mother-daughter version were made between the seventeenth and late eighteenth century. A poem by Sibylla Schwarz(1612–38) on egalitarian relationships among women uses the anecdote. A few years after Poussin's painting of The Gathering of the Manna, Guercino produced an intimate portrait of the mother and daughter (before 1661). This is the last known depiction of the scene before its brief resurgence in the late eighteenth century when three paintings by Jean-Charles Nicaise Perrin (1791, lost), Angelika Kauffmann (1794, lost), and Etienne-Barthélemy Garnier (1801, lost) were made depicting the scene. Perhaps this brief resurgence of interest can be explained by a French Revolutionary theme of political equality which found resonance in the reciprocity within kinship relations that the mother-daughter version displayed. The reversal of patriarchal relations that Pero and Cimon could be seen as symbolizing, while meaningful under the ancient regime, was now passé.

== Modern cultural influence ==
In the 20th century, a fictional account of Roman Charity was presented in John Steinbeck's The Grapes of Wrath (1939). At the end of the novel, Rosasharn (Rose of Sharon), whose baby was stillborn, nurses a sick and starving man (unrelated to her) in the corner of a barn. The 1969 painting Partisan Ballad by Mai Dantsig also echoes Roman Charity.

The 1973 surrealist film O Lucky Man! also contains a scene of Roman Charity when the protagonist is starving and a vicar's wife nurses him rather than let him plunder the food gathered for an offering.

== Depictions with articles ==
- Roman Charity by Rubens, c. 1612, Hermitage Museum
- Cimon and Pero by Rubens, 1630, Siegen
- Caritas Romana, Gaspar de Crayen aaron, Prado
- Caritas Romana, Gaspar de Crayer, c. 1645, private collection

== Artists' depictions ==
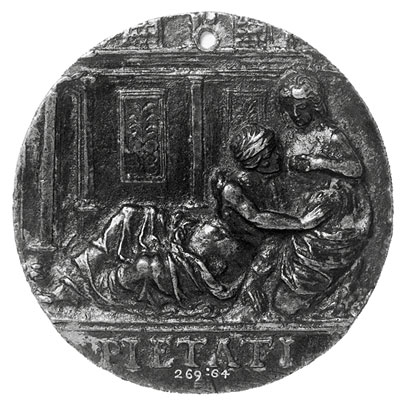
Artist unknown.
(c. 1500–1520)

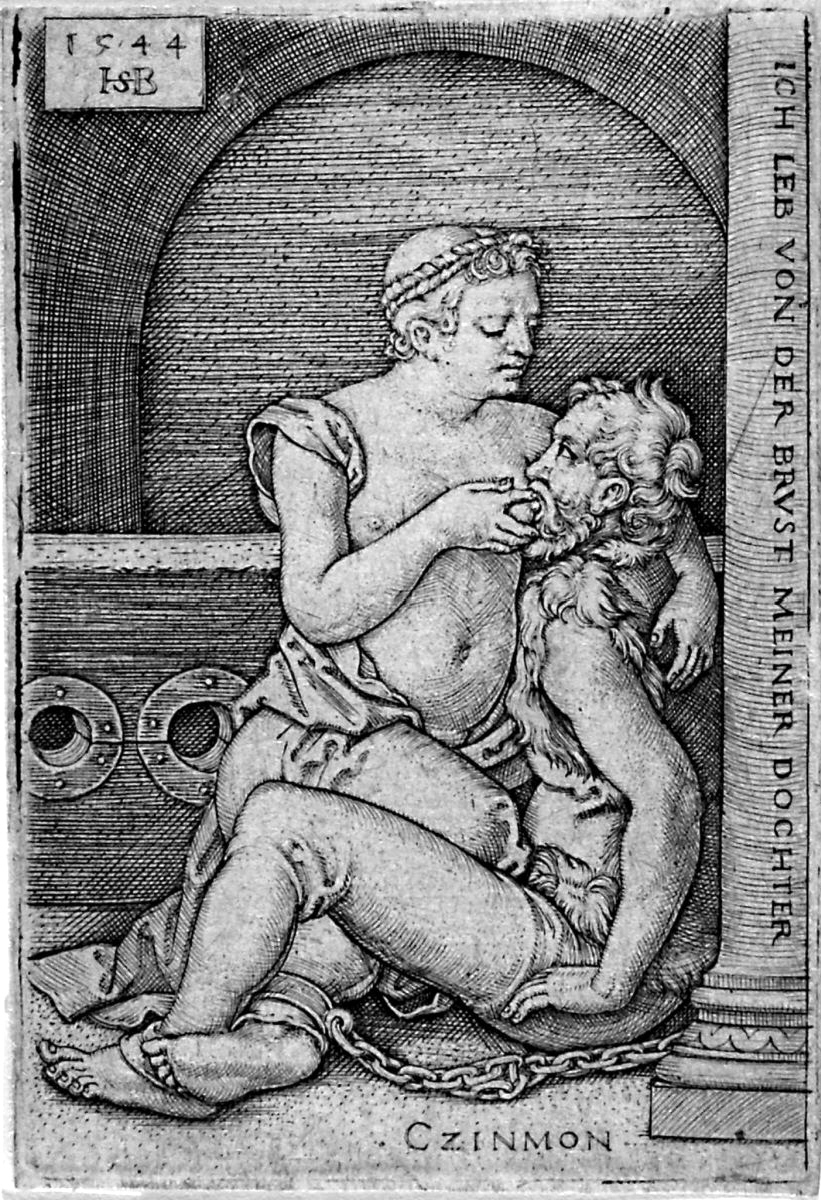
Hans Sebald Beham
(1544)

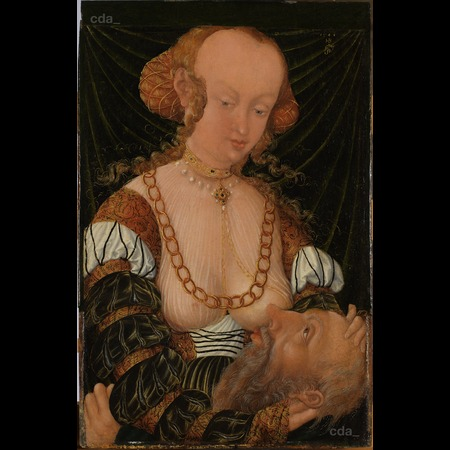
Master with the Griffin's Head (c.1546)

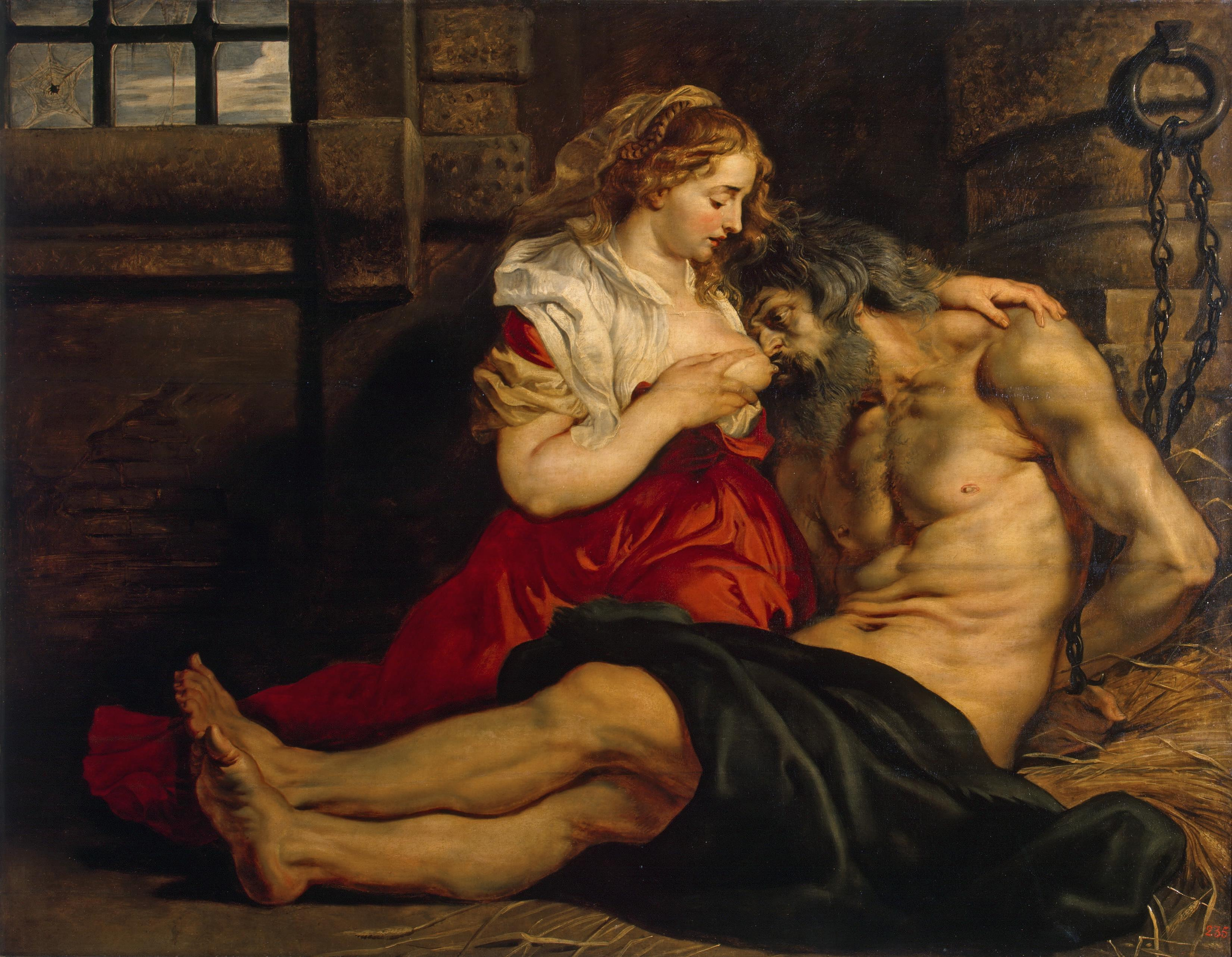
Peter Paul Rubens
(c. 1612)

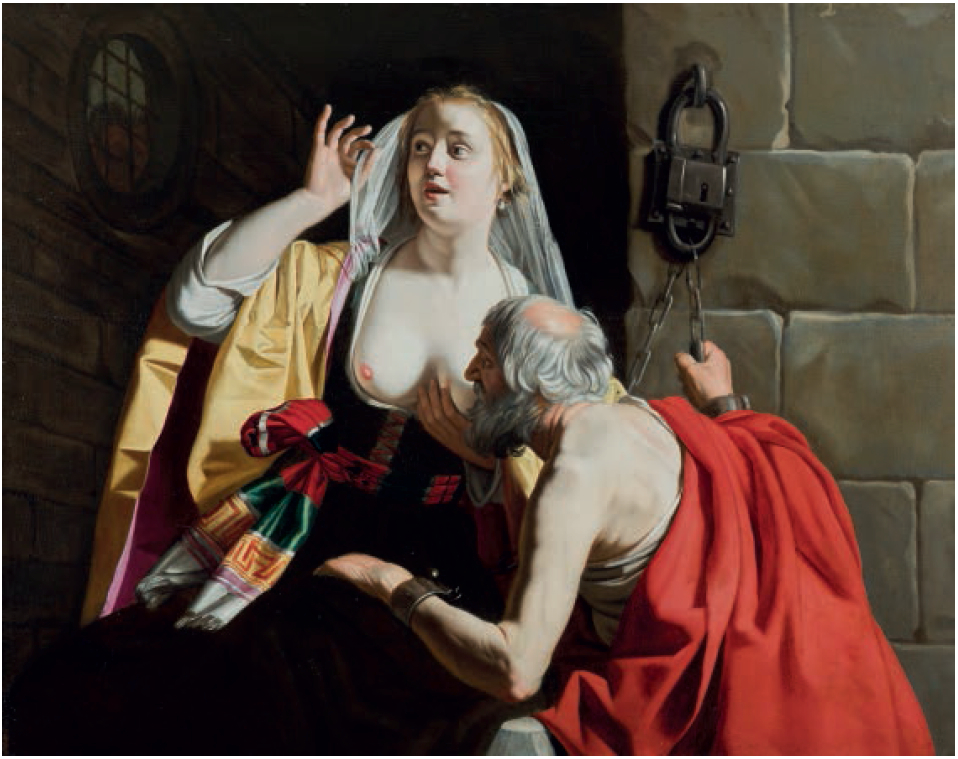
Jan Janssens
(1620–25)

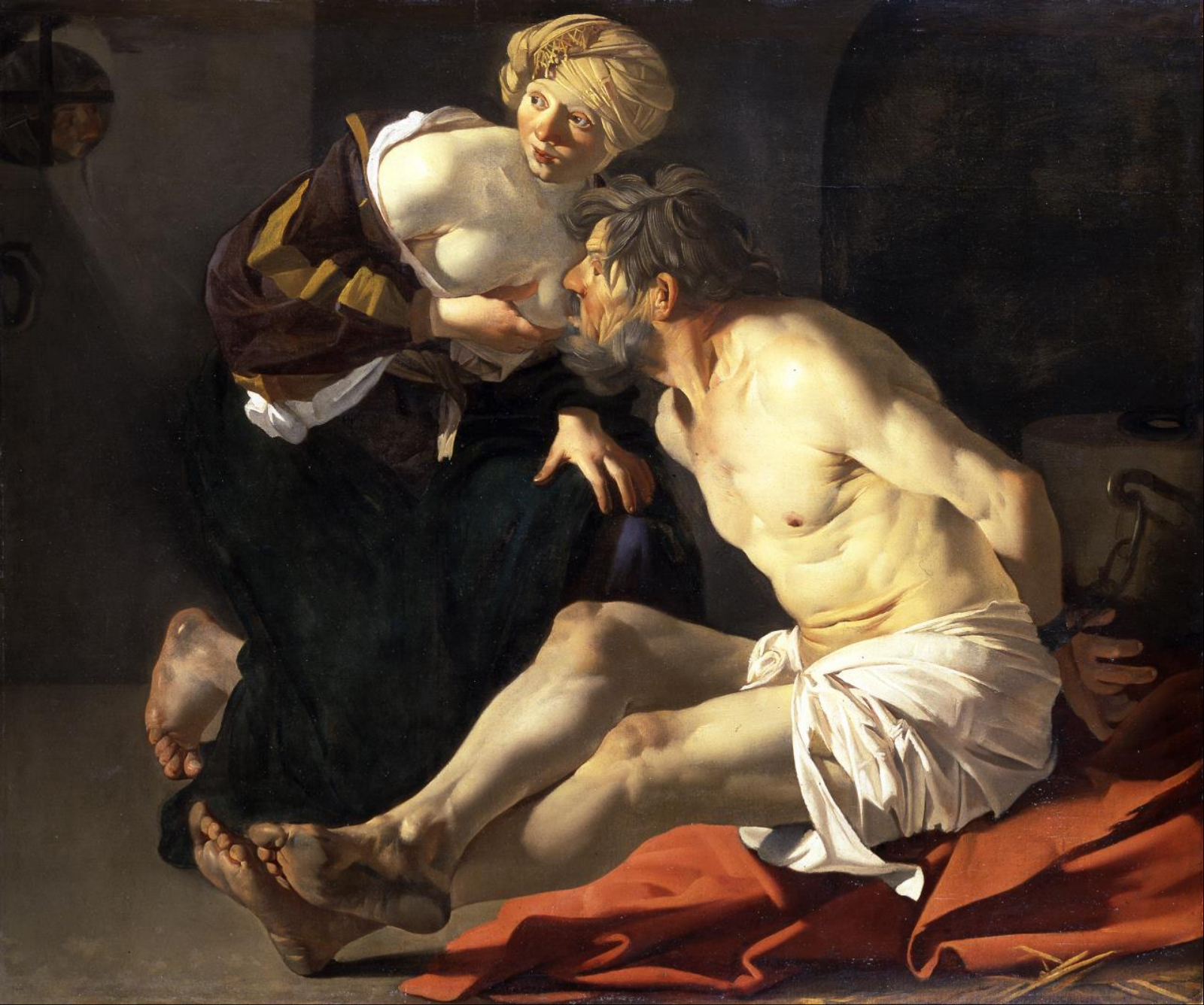
Dirck Van Baburen
(c. 1623)

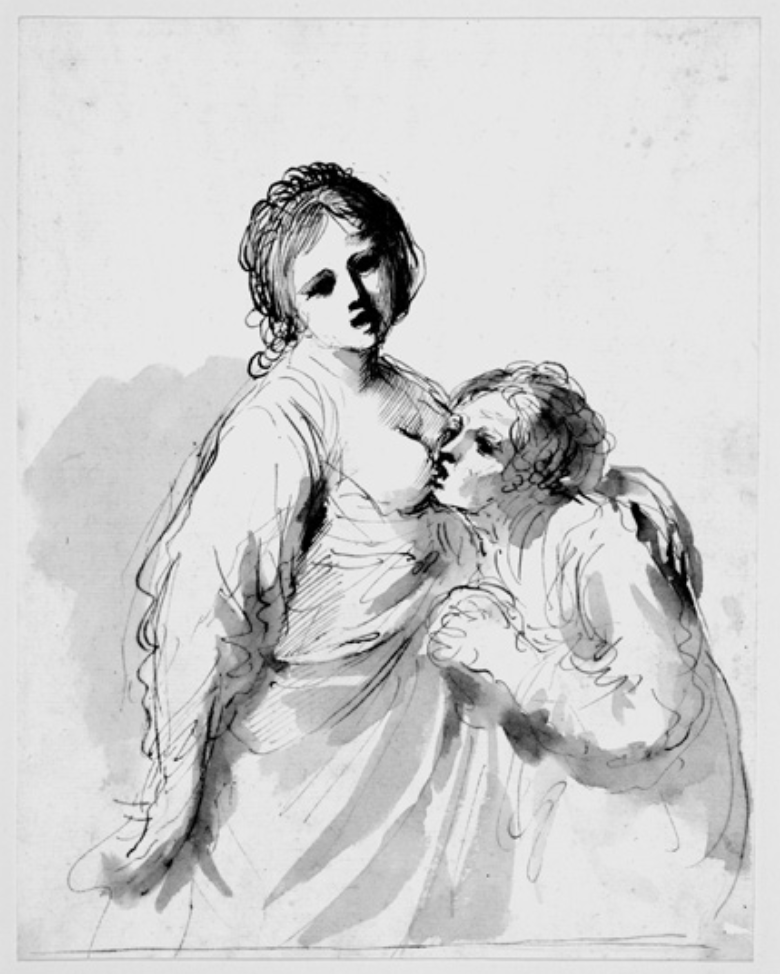
Guercino
(before 1661)

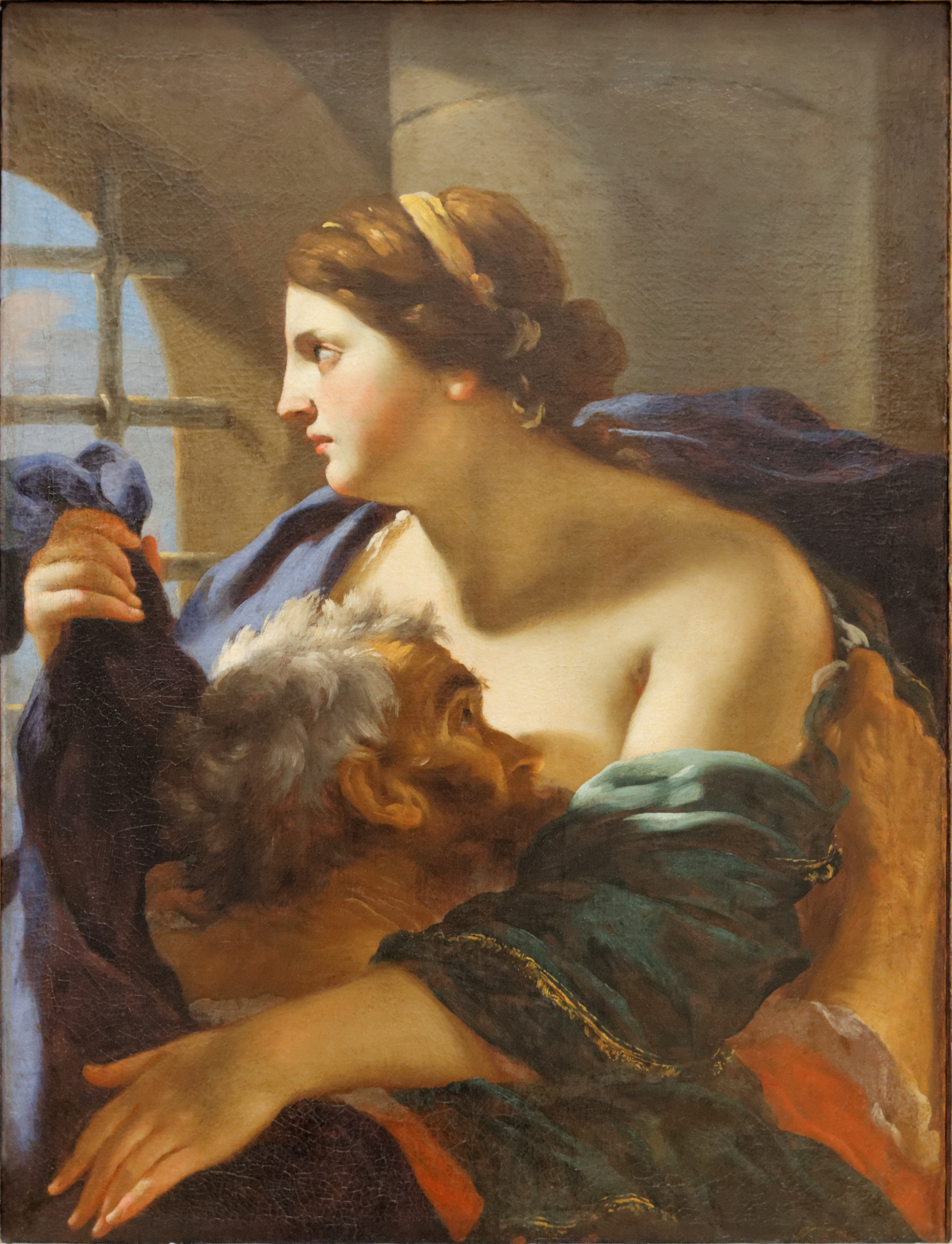
Charles Mellin
(c. 1628)

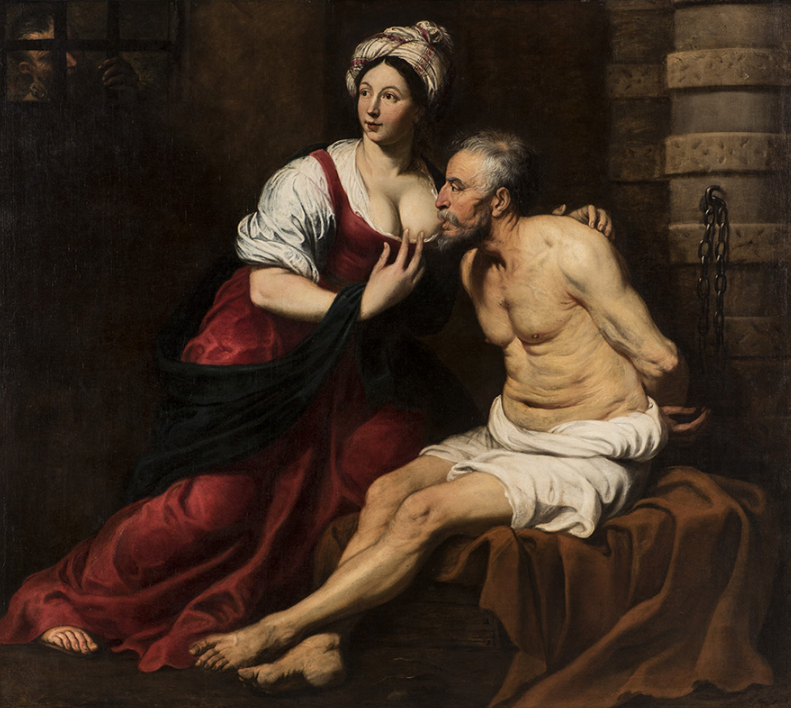
Pieter van Mol
(c. 1640)

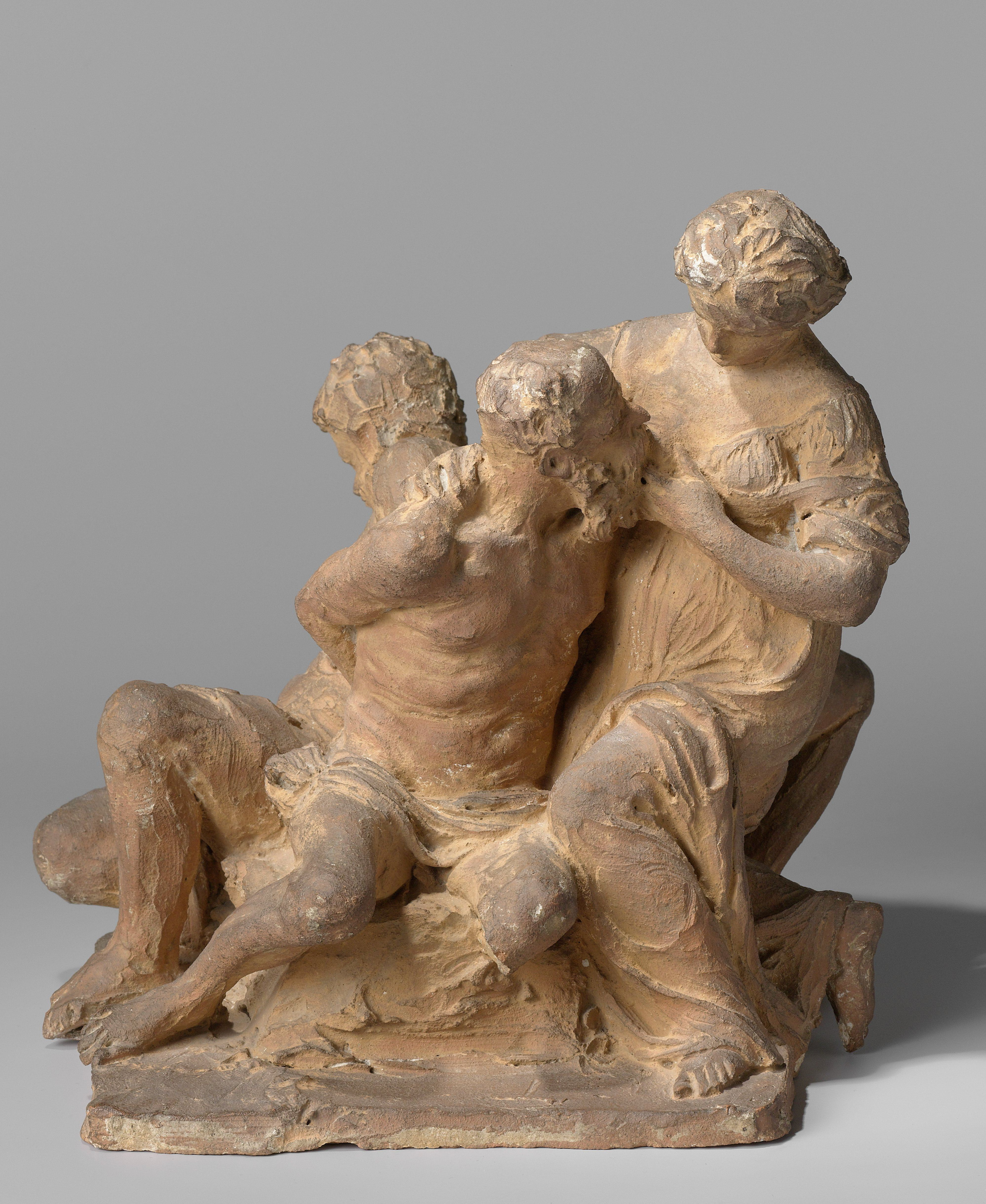
Artus Quellinus the Elder
(c. 1652)

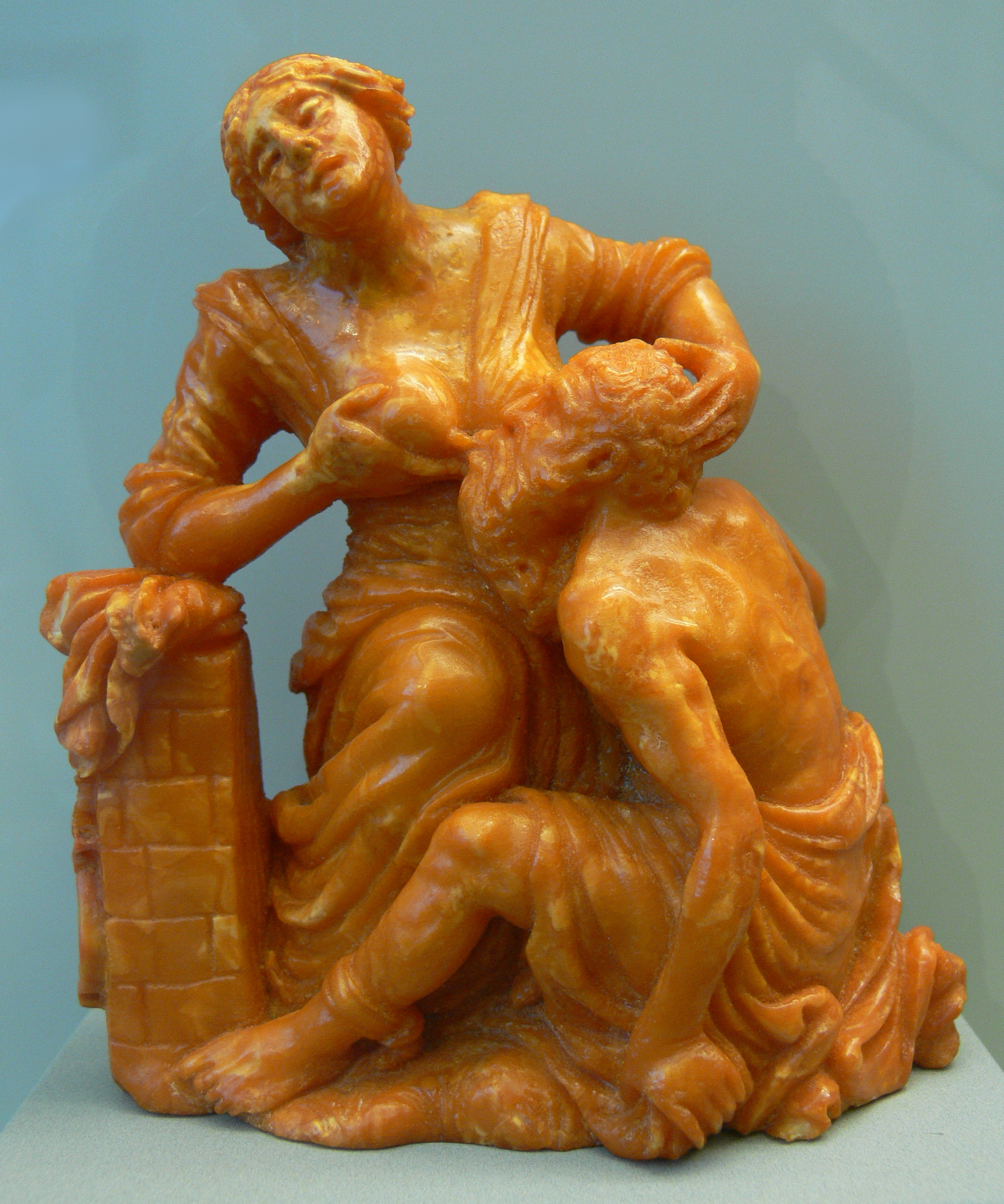
Christoph Maucher
(amber, 1690)

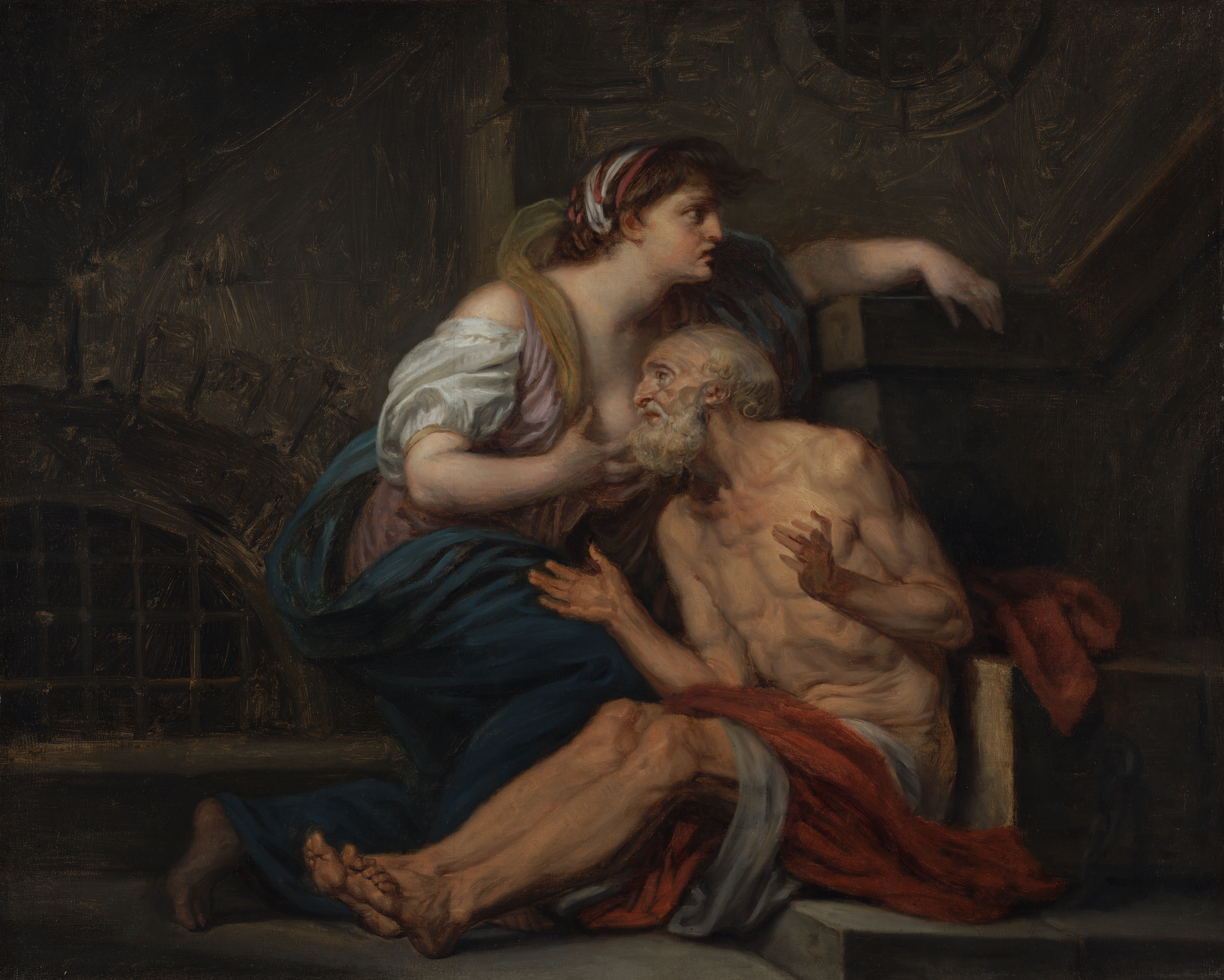
Jean-Baptiste Greuze
(c. 1767)

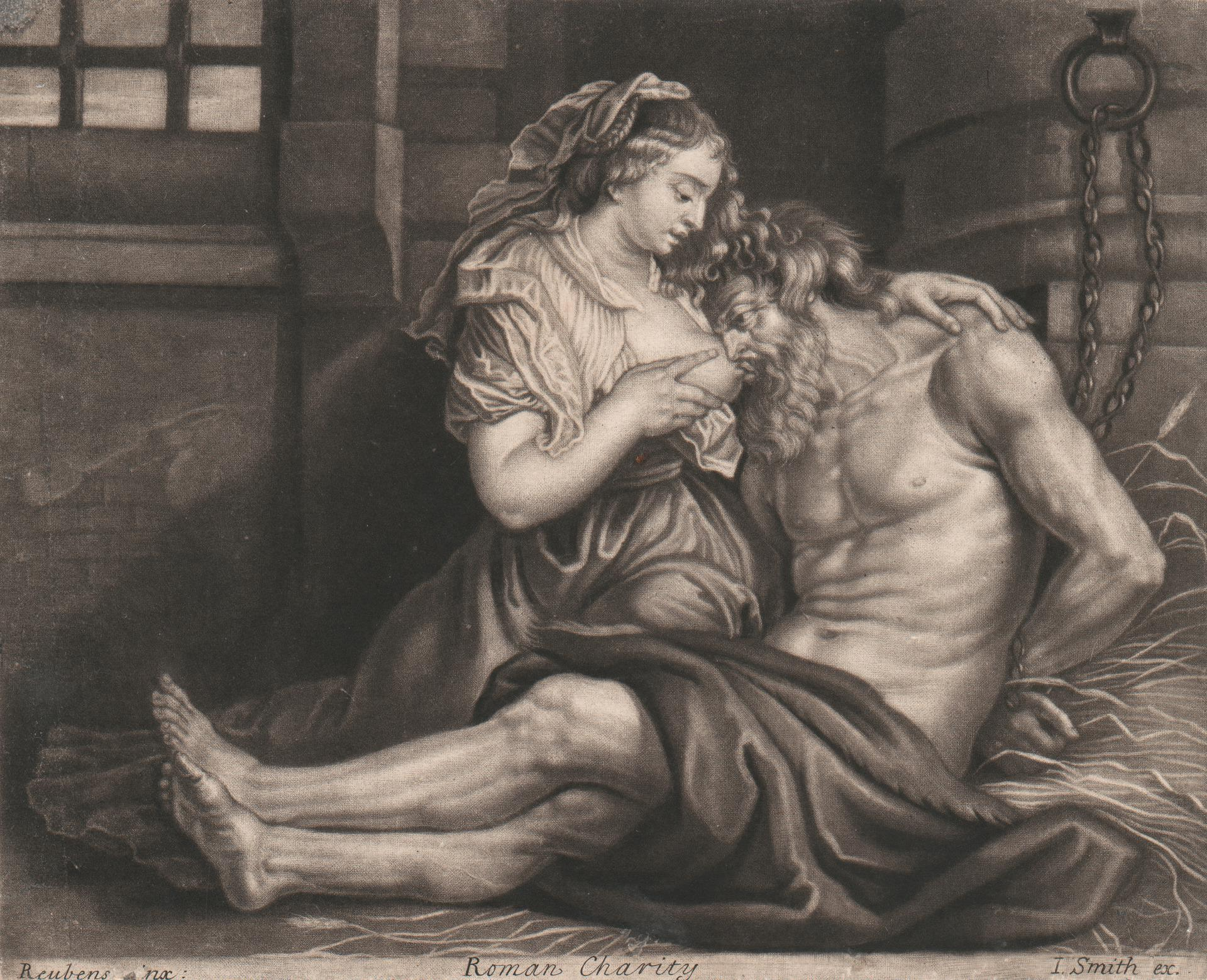
Mezzotint print by John Smith

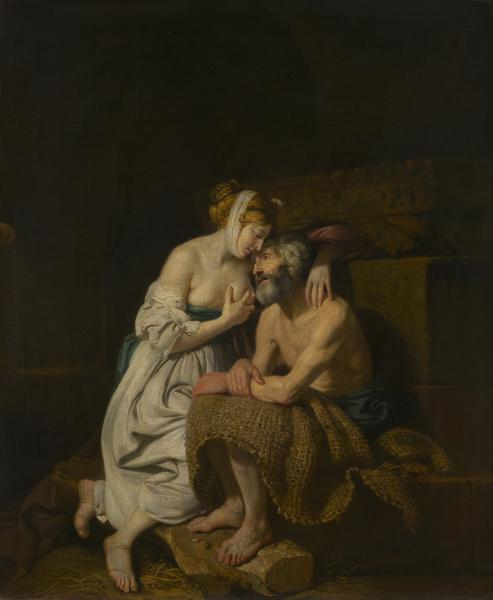
Johan Zoffany
(c. 1769)

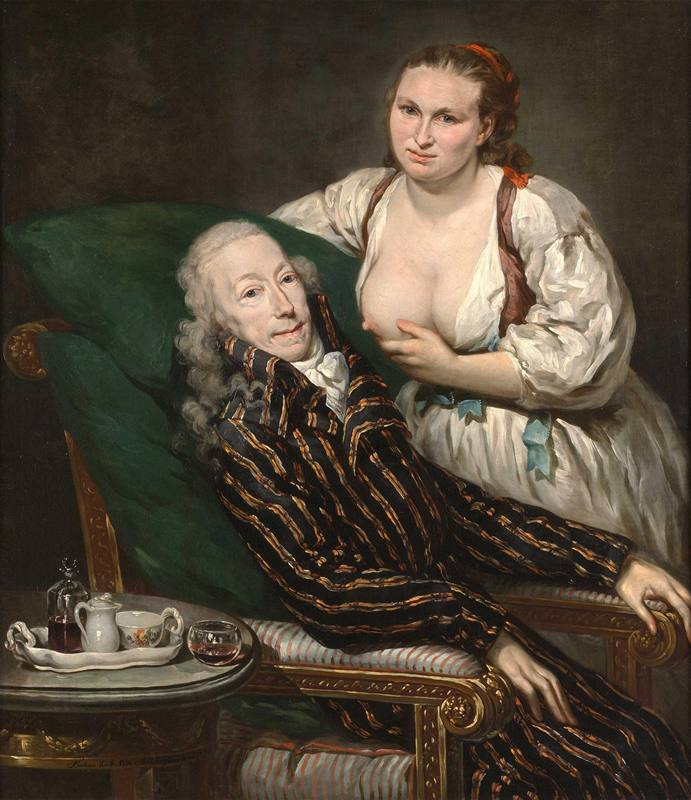
Barbara Krafft
(1797)

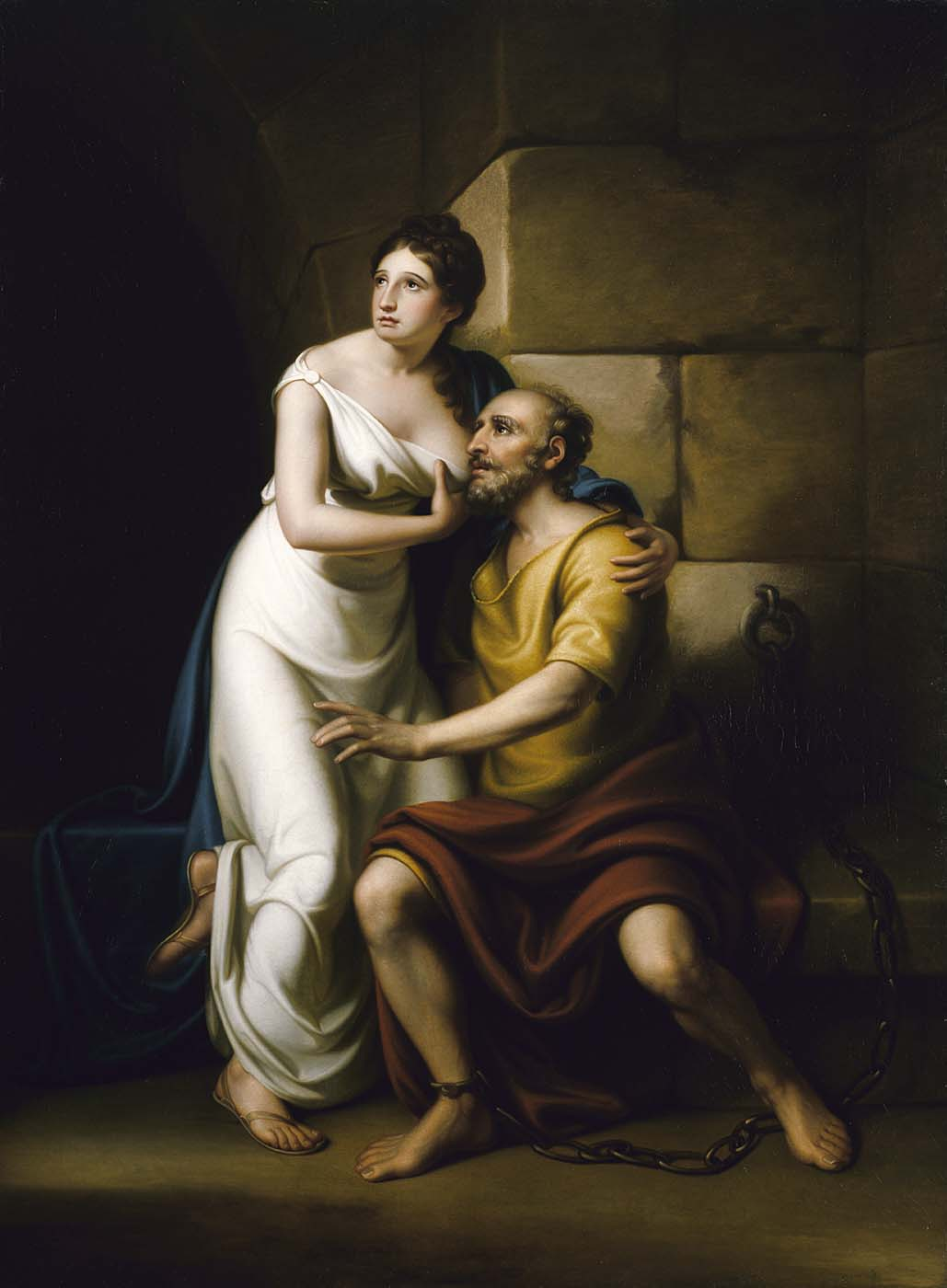
Rembrandt Peale
(1811)
