= Christ Blessing the Children (Lucas Cranach the Elder) =

Painting by Lucas Cranach the Elder

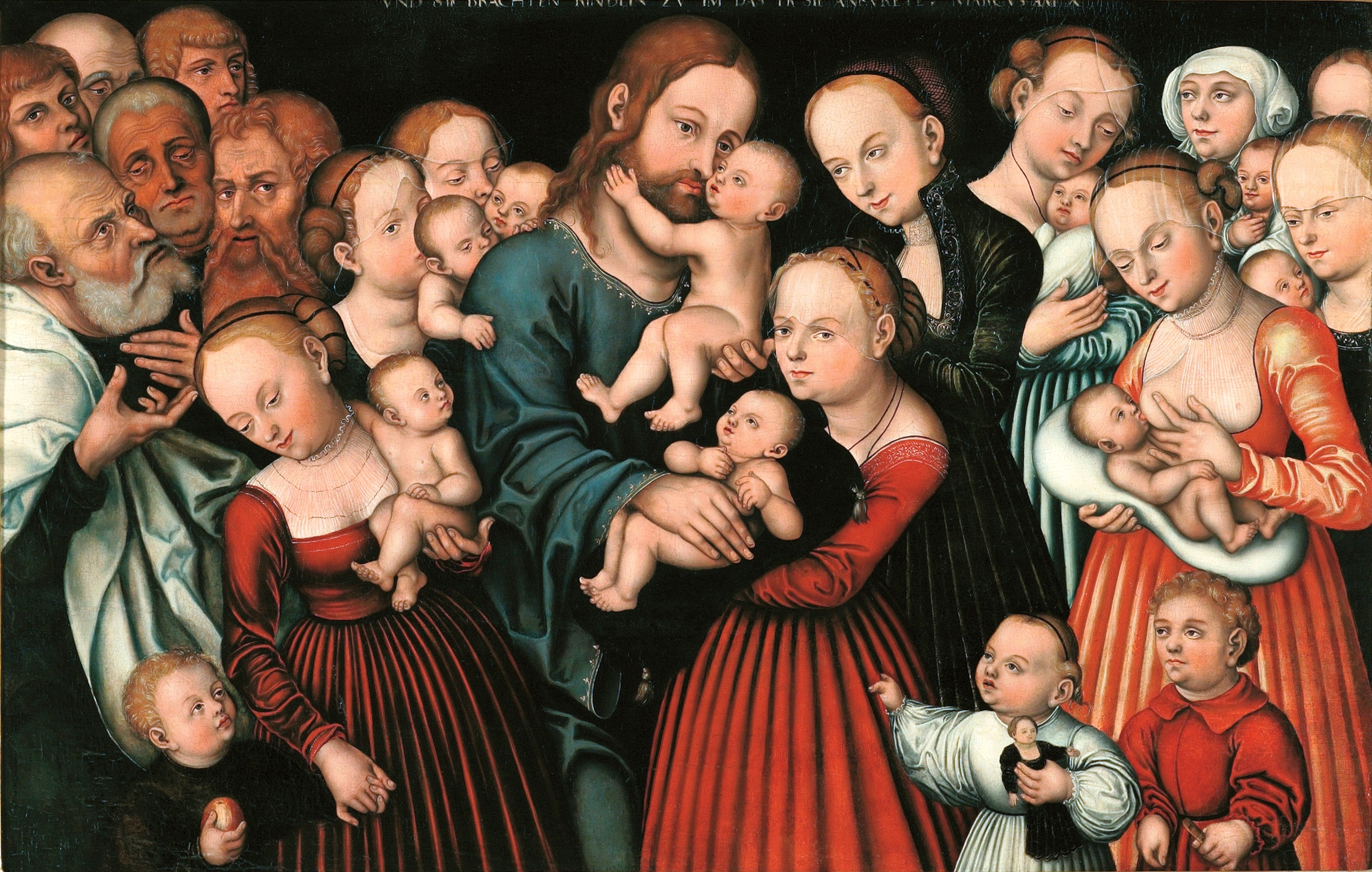
- Let the little children come to me
- Artist: Lucas Cranach the Elder
- Year: 1537
- Medium: Oil on beech
- Movement: German Renaissance
- Dimensions: 122 cm × 77.5 cm (48 in × 30.5 in)
- Location: Kraków, Poland
- Owner: Wawel Castle

Christ Blessing the Children (German: Christus segnet die Kinder) is a religious oil painting created by the German Renaissance artist Lucas Cranach the Elder and his workshop in 1537.

== History and description ==
Made and painted by Lucas Cranach the Elder, the painting depicts Jesus Christ with children, based on the New Testament verse "Suffer the little children to come unto me, and forbid them not: for of such is the kingdom of God" (Mark 10:14); a popular subject of Protestant iconography in line with the Lutheran teachings of Sola gratia and Sola Fide; salvation by grace through faith, a theme which was depicted repeatedly by both Lucas Cranach the Elder and his son Lucas Cranach the Younger. Jesus is depicted in a dark blue tunic, surrounded by a group of mothers with children with apostles standing off to the side. In 1922, it was purchased for the collection of Wawel Castle in Kraków from Ignacy Dubowski of Volhynia, Bishop of Lutsk. Looted by the Nazis during World War II, it was later discovered in Vienna, and was returned to Wawel in 1968.

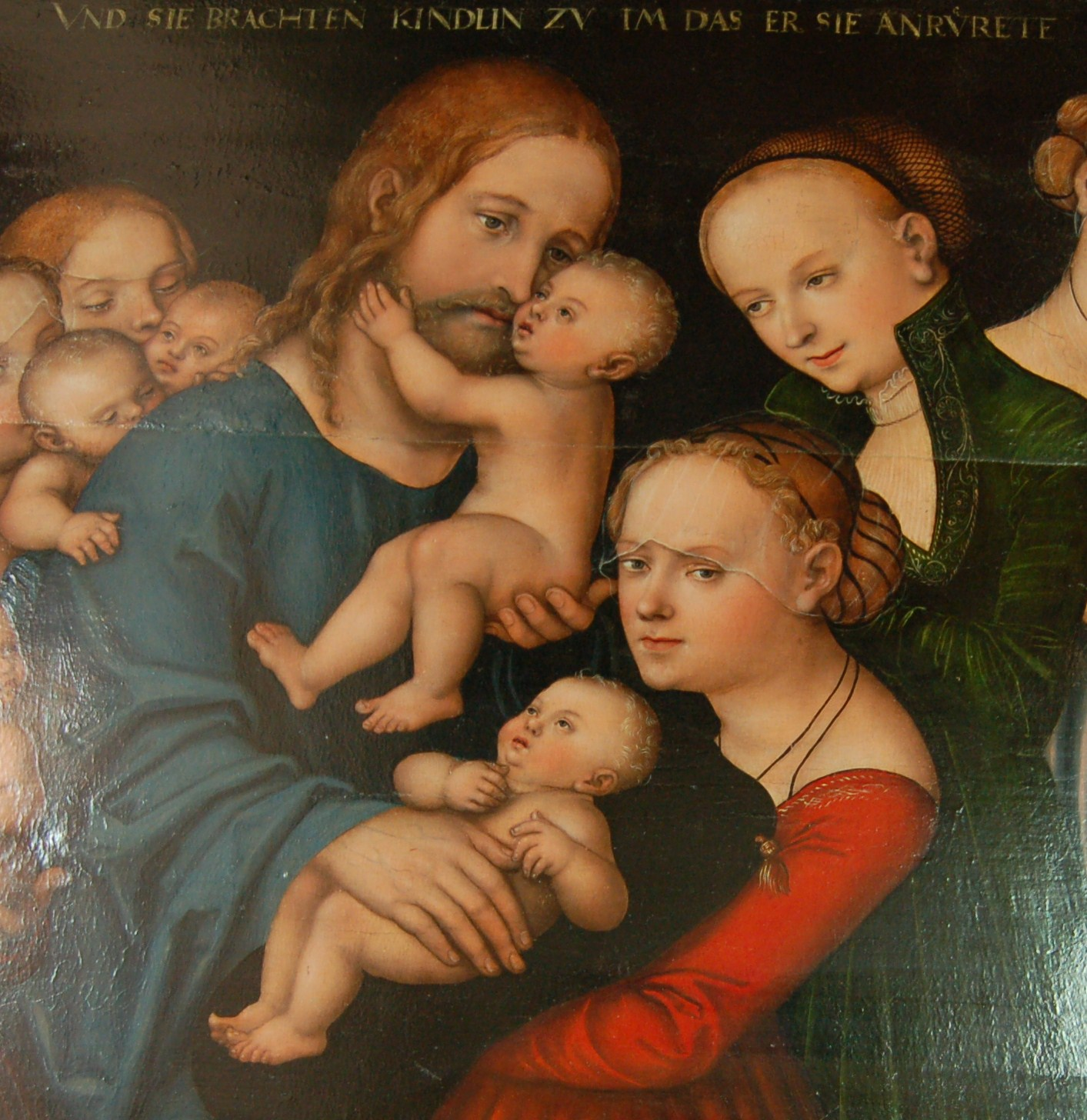
Detail of a reproduction oil painting in Larvik church, Norway

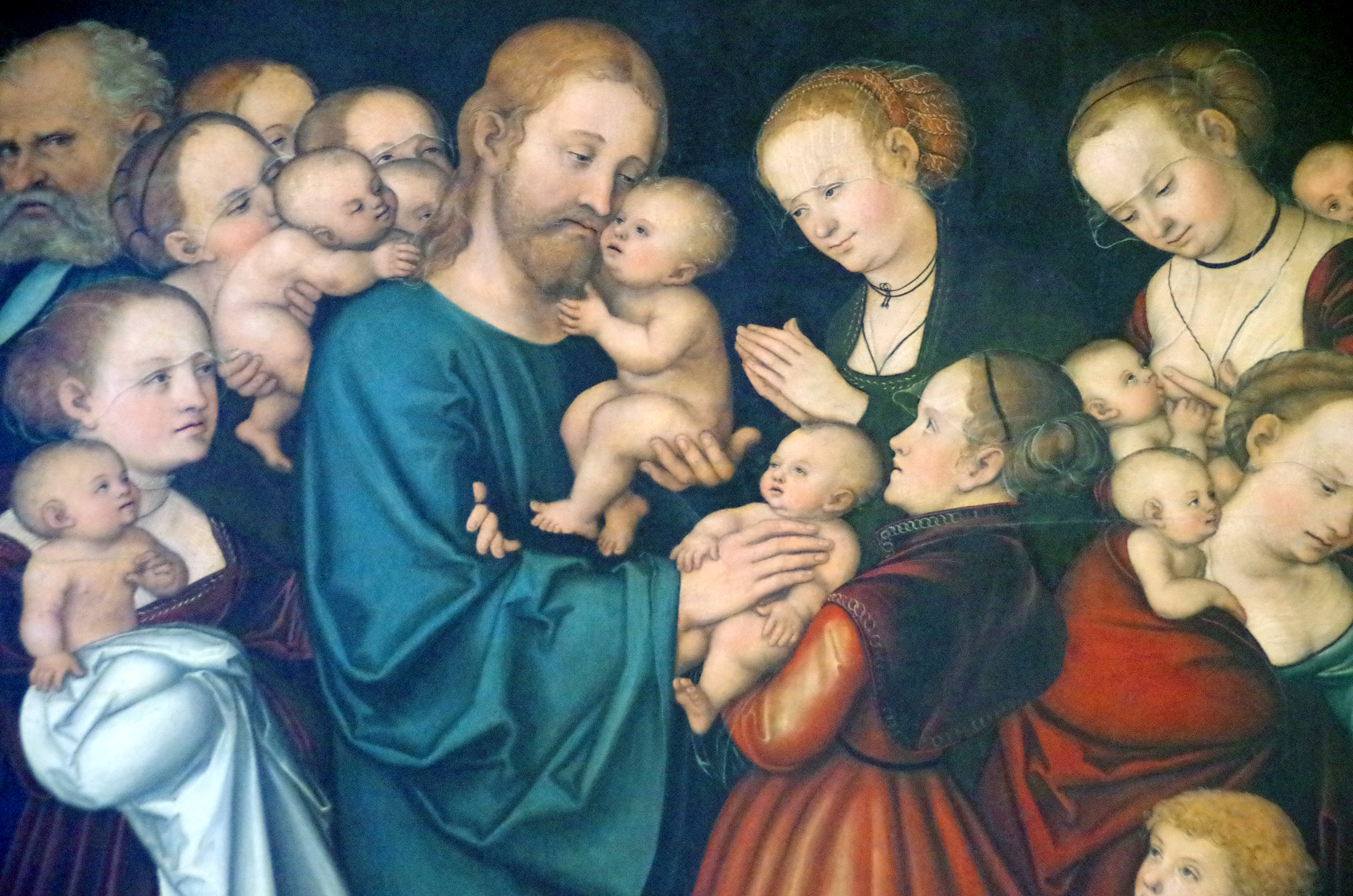
Evangelical Lutheran city church of St. Wenzel in Naumburg

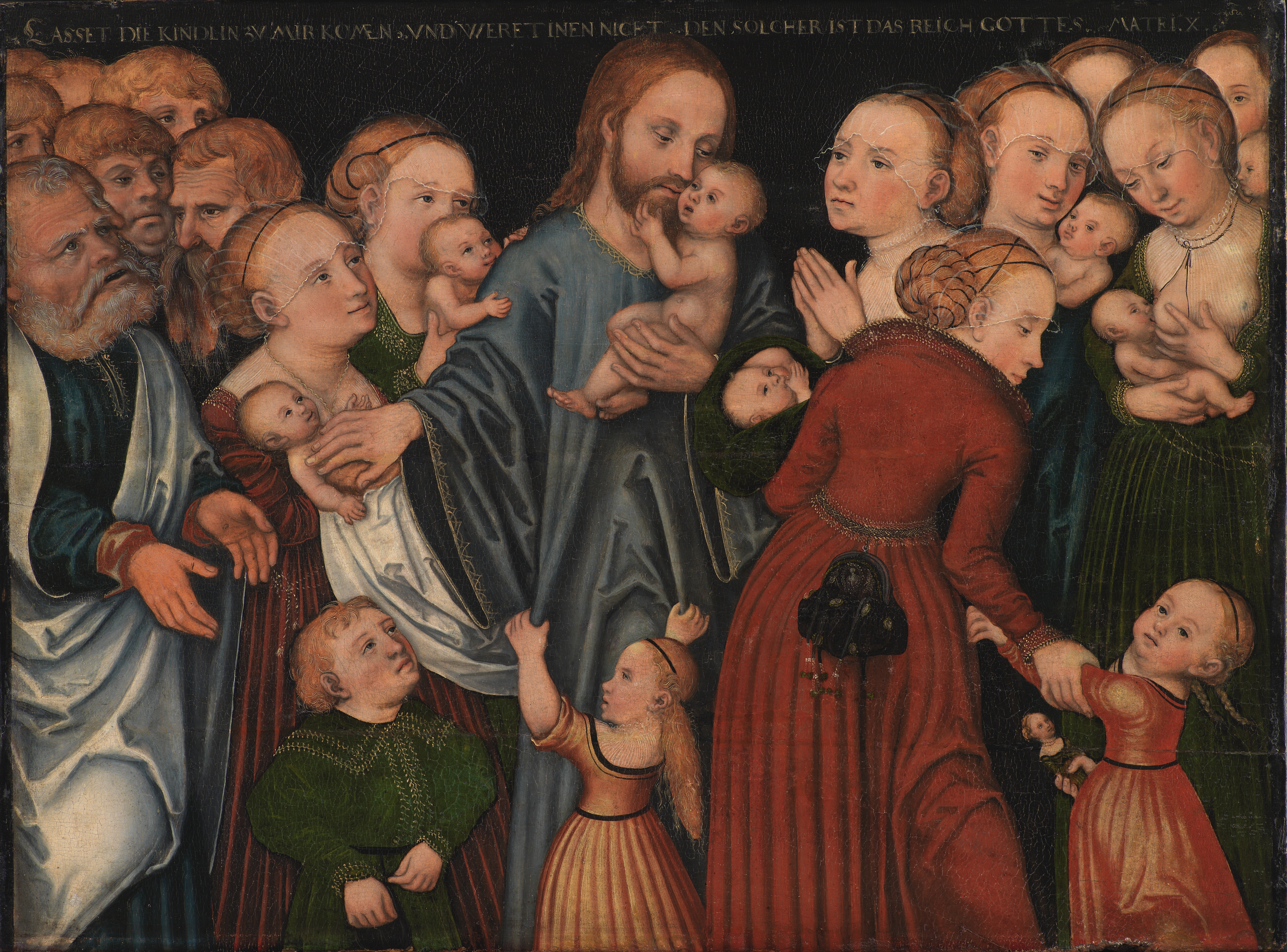
National Gallery of Denmark

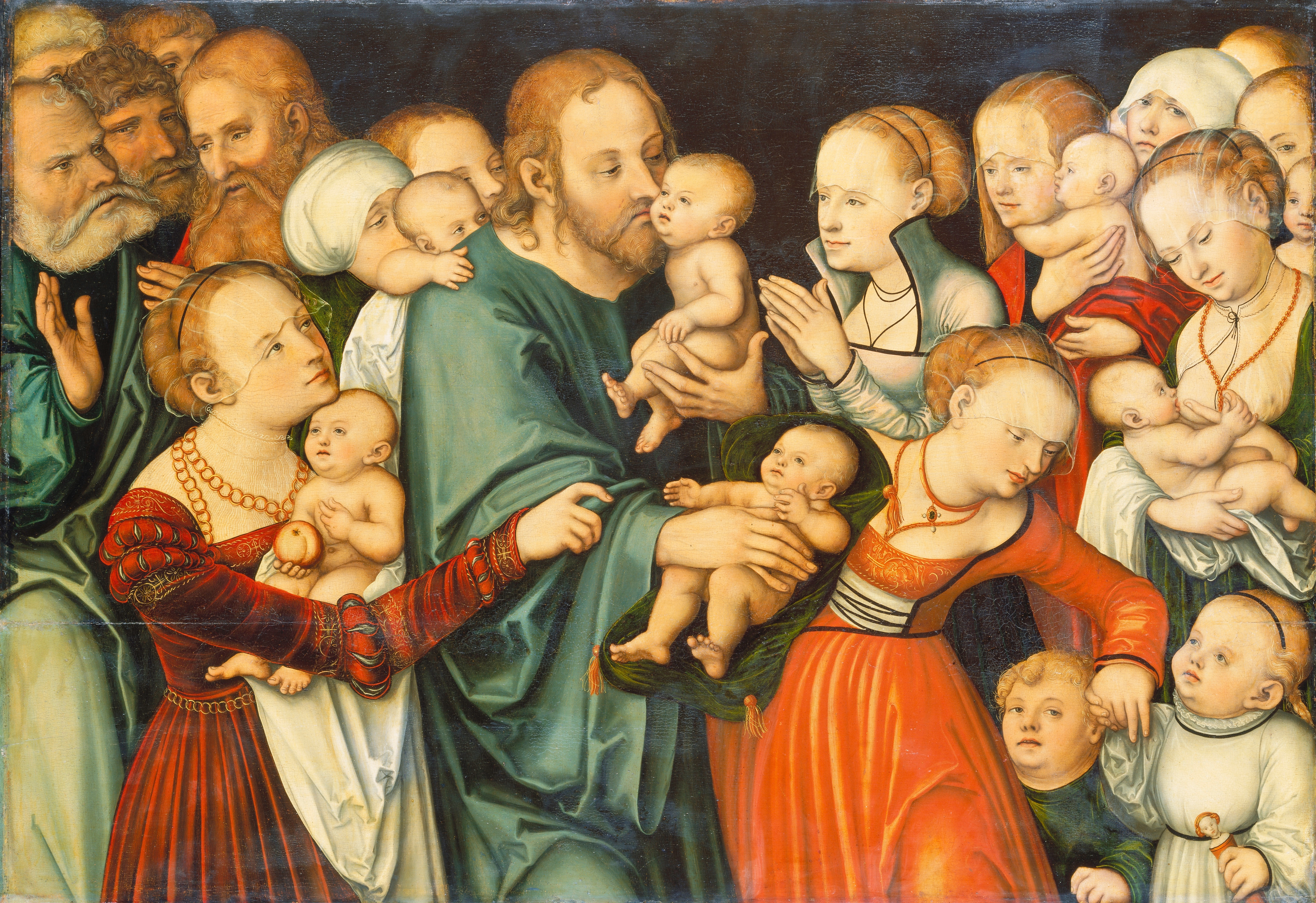
Städel Museum

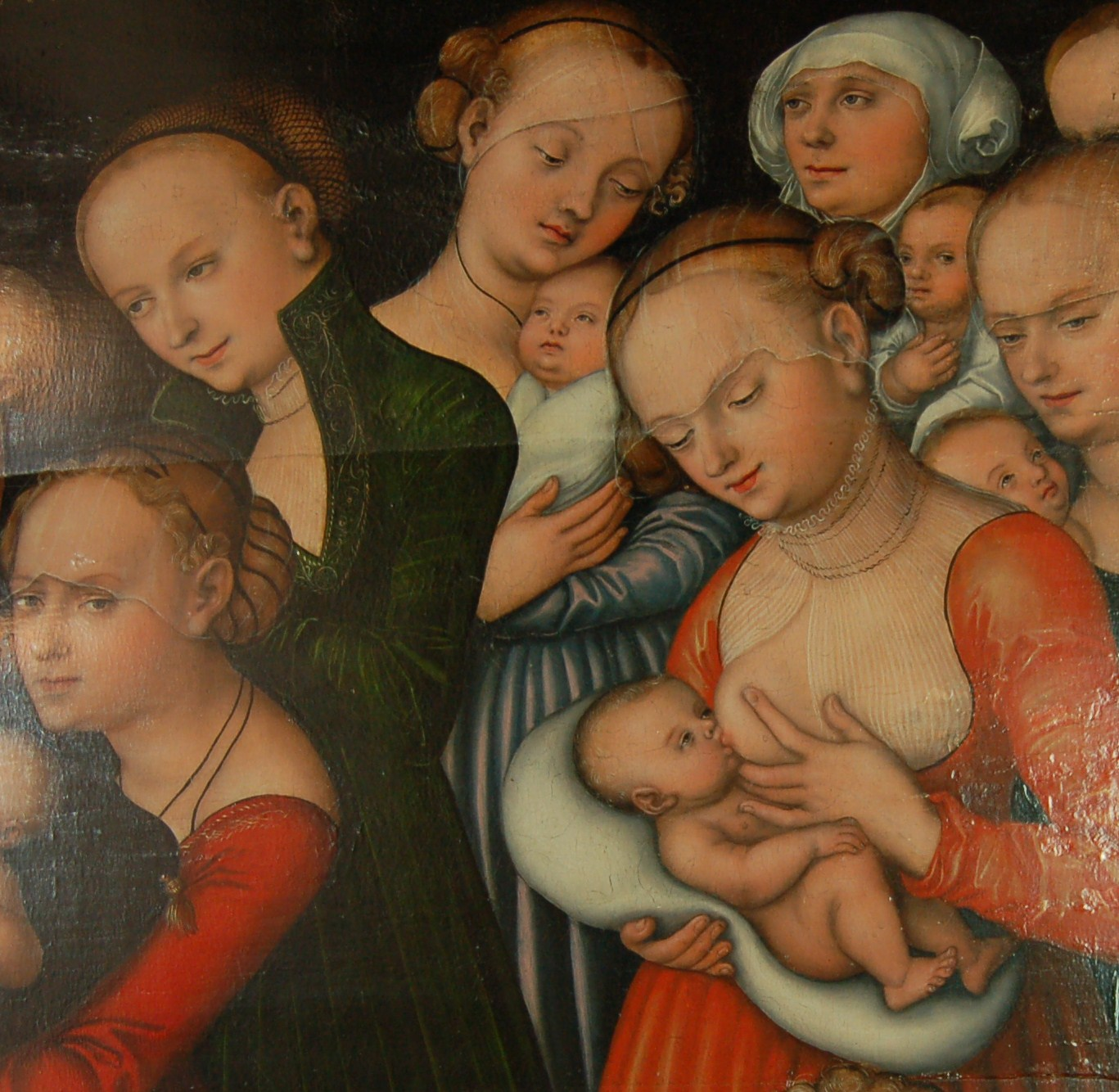
Detail of breastfeeding scene in Larvik church, Norway

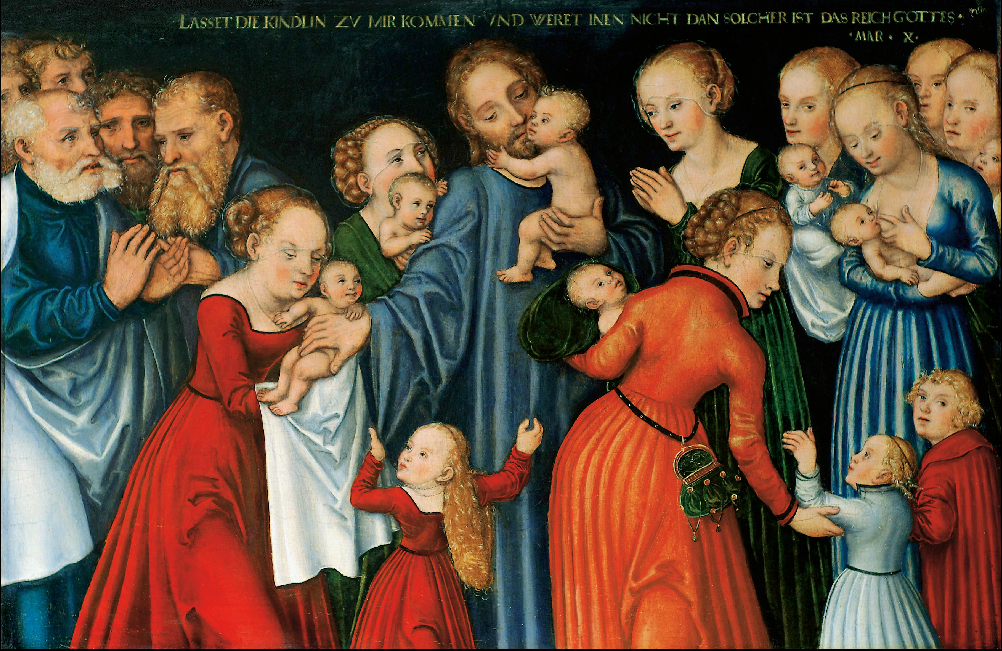

== See also ==
- Breastfeeding in art
