= Charity (Reni, New York) =

Painting by Guido Reni (Metropolitan Museum of Art)

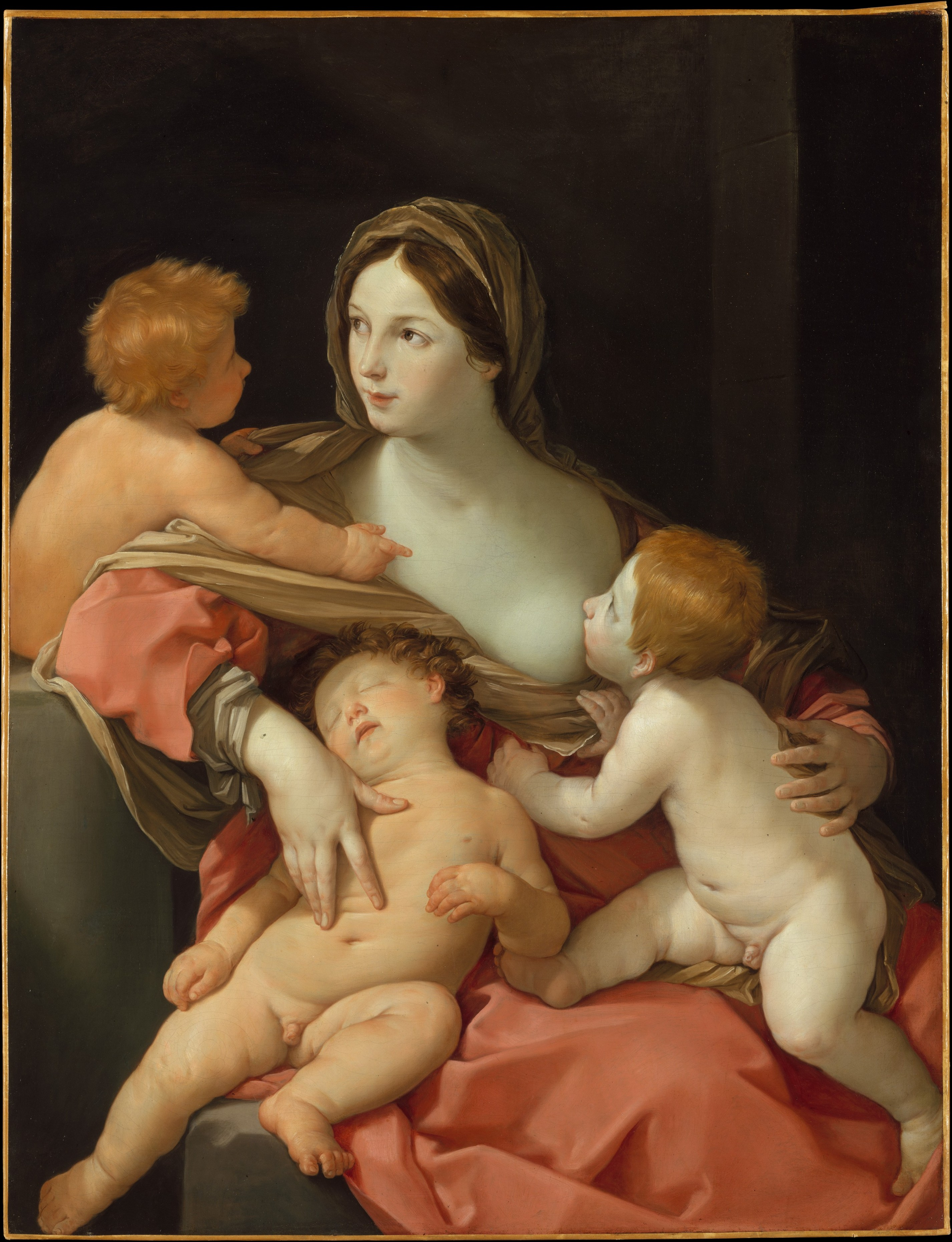
Charity (c. 1629–1630) by Guido Reni

Charity is an oil on canvas painting by Guido Reni, created possibly in 1629–1630. It is held at the Metropolitan Museum of Art, in New York, to which it was donated by Mr and Mrs Charles Wrightsman in 1974.

The work is first recorded in a 1767 inventory of the collection of Joseph Wenzel I, Prince of Liechtenstein. It remained in the princely collection until Johann II, Prince of Liechtenstein auctioned it in Paris on 16 May 1882. It then remained in a Parisian private collection until about 1933 with as misattribution to Simon Vouet, after which it passed through two art dealers before being bought in New York by the Wrightsmans in 1968.

== See also ==
- Breastfeeding in art
