= Cimon and Pero (Rubens) =

1630 painting by Peter Paul Rubens

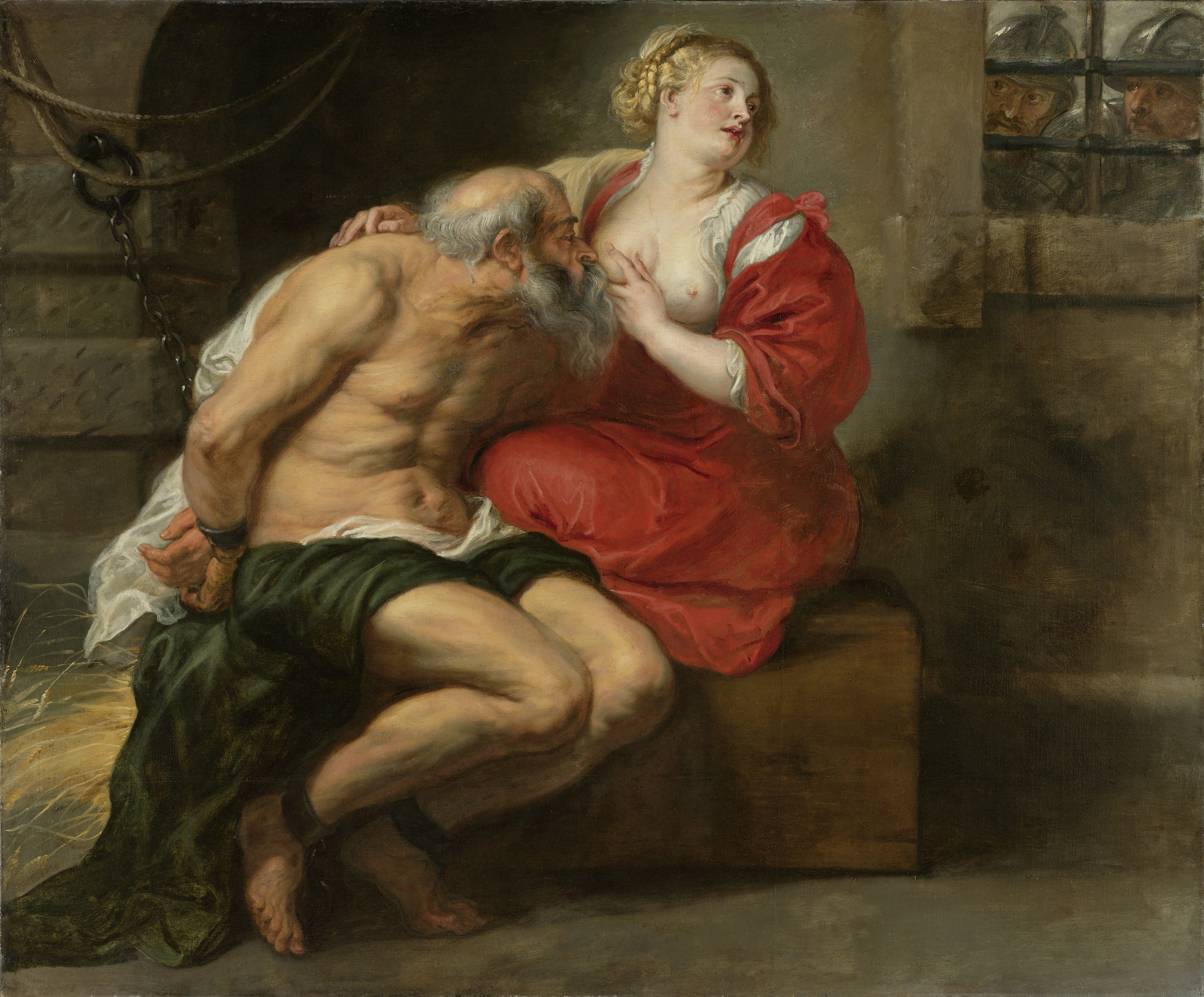
Cimon and Pero (1630) by Rubens

Cimon and Pero is a 1630 oil on canvas painting by Peter Paul Rubens, now in the Siegerlandmuseum in Siegen, Germany. It shows a return to the subject Roman Charity, which Rubens had previously painted around 1612.

== See also ==
- Breastfeeding in art
