= Partisan Ballad =

1969 painting by Mai Dantsig

- Artist: Mai Dantsig
- Year: 1969
- Medium: Oil on canvas
- Dimensions: 300 cm × 300 cm (120 in × 120 in)
- Location: Private collection (Art Russe)

Partisan Ballad is a painting by Belarusian artist Mai Dantsig showing a partisan woman breastfeeding a weary partisan man during World War II. Both are equipped with rifles and ammunition belts. Dantsig borrowed the Roman Charity theme, having seen the eponymous painting by Peter Paul Rubens in the Hermitage Museum. Partisan Ballad alludes to the German occupation of the Soviet Union on the Eastern Front of World War II when Belarusian SSR became the haven of Soviet partisans.

The Partisan Ballad was at one time removed from the exhibition in the Minsk Palace of Arts when the local Soviet exhibition committee viewed the painting as an "incest". Dantsig subsequently kept the painting in his workshop before exhibiting it again in the Central House of Artists in Moscow. In 2015, Partisan Ballad was exhibited in the Saatchi Gallery in London.

== See also ==
- Breastfeeding in art
