= Teachings of Jesus about little children =

Biblical scene of Jesus of Nazareth blessing children and popular theme in art

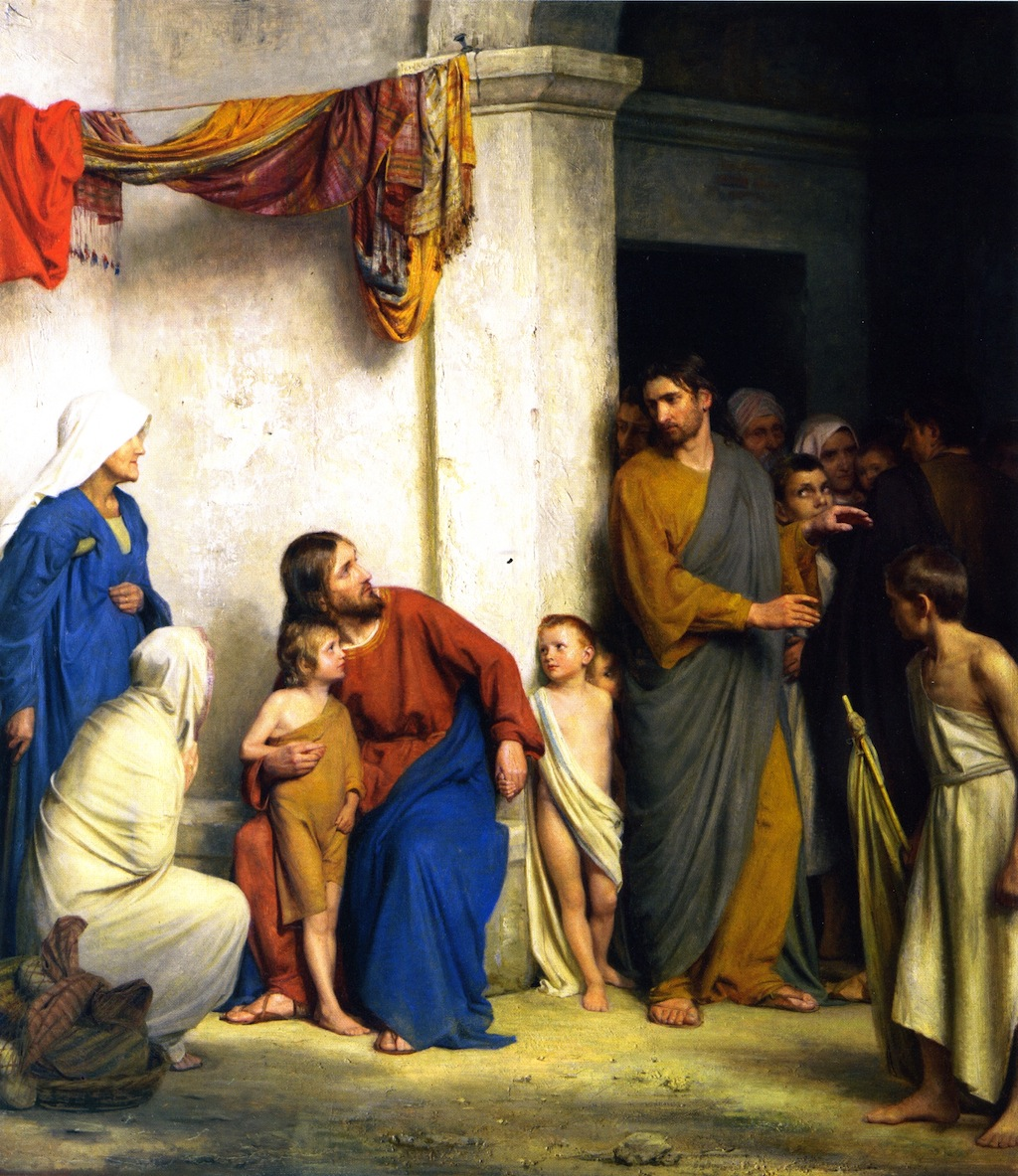
Christ with children by Carl Heinrich Bloch

Jesus' teachings referring to little children (παιδίον, paidíon) and infants/babies appear in a few places in the New Testament and in the non-canonical Gospel of Thomas.

== New Testament ==
The King James Version of Matthew's gospel (chapter 18) relates that:

At the same time came the disciples unto Jesus, saying, Who is the greatest in the kingdom of heaven? ²And Jesus called a little child unto him, and set him in the midst of them, ³And said, Verily I say unto you, Except ye be converted, and become as little children, ye shall not enter into the kingdom of heaven. ⁴Whosoever therefore shall humble himself as this little child, the same is greatest in the kingdom of heaven. ⁵And whoso shall receive one such little child in my name receiveth me. ⁶But whoso shall offend one of these little ones which believe in me, it were better for him that a millstone were hanged about his neck, and that he were drowned in the depth of the sea.

⁷Woe unto the world because of offences! for it must needs be that offences come; but woe to that man by whom the offence cometh! ⁸Wherefore if thy hand or thy foot offend thee, cut them off, and cast them from thee: it is better for thee to enter into life halt or maimed, rather than having two hands or two feet to be cast into everlasting fire. ⁹And if thine eye offend thee, pluck it out, and cast it from thee: it is better for thee to enter into life with one eye, rather than having two eyes to be cast into hell fire. ¹⁰Take heed that ye despise not one of these little ones; for I say unto you, That in heaven their angels do always behold the face of my Father which is in heaven.

— Matthew 18:1–10

The word translated as converted in the King James Version (Greek: στράφητε, straphēte) literally means 'turn'. It is translated as "turn" in the English and American Standard Versions and as "change" in the New International Version. Elsewhere in the New Testament, the change of heart demanded by John the Baptist and by Jesus often uses the word metanoia (Greek: μετάνοια). German theologian Heinrich Meyer suggests that Jesus' challenge to his disciples is to "turn round upon [the] road, and to acquire a moral disposition similar to the nature of little children".

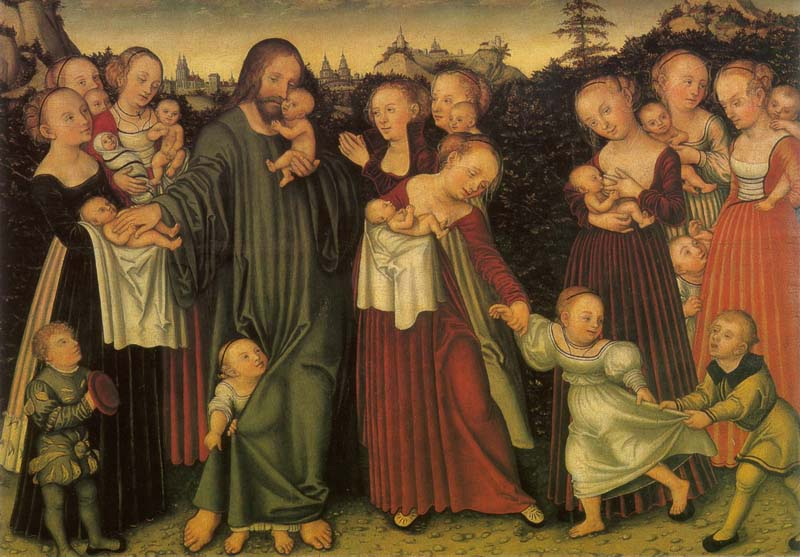
Christ Blessing the Children by Lucas Cranach the Younger, 1537

The Kingdom of Heaven is compared to little children at other places in the New Testament:

- Matthew 19:13–15
  Then were there brought unto him little children, that he should put his hands on them, and pray: and the disciples rebuked them. ¹⁴But Jesus said, Suffer little children, and forbid them not, to come unto me: for of such is the kingdom of heaven. ¹⁵And he laid his hands on them, and departed thence.
- Mark 10:13–16
  And they brought young children to him, that he should touch them: and his disciples rebuked those that brought them. ¹⁴But when Jesus saw it, he was much displeased, and said unto them, Suffer the little children to come unto me, and forbid them not: for of such is the kingdom of God. ¹⁵Verily I say unto you, Whosoever shall not receive the kingdom of God as a little child, he shall not enter therein. ¹⁶And he took them up in his arms, put his hands upon them, and blessed them.
- Luke 18:15–17
  And they brought unto him also infants, that he would touch them: but when his disciples saw it, they rebuked them. ¹⁶But Jesus called them unto him, and said, Suffer little children to come unto me, and forbid them not: for of such is the kingdom of God. ¹⁷Verily I say unto you, Whosoever shall not receive the kingdom of God as a little child shall in no wise enter therein.
- Matthew 21:15–16
  And when the chief priests and scribes saw the wonderful things that he did, and the children crying in the temple, and saying, Hosanna to the son of David; they were sore displeased, ¹⁶And said unto him, Hearest thou what these say? And Jesus saith unto them, Yea; have ye never read, Out of the mouth of babes and sucklings thou hast perfected praise?

== Gospel of Thomas ==
Another saying referring to small children can be found in the non-canonical Gospel of Thomas. The two passages (Matthew 18:1–6 and the passage in Thomas) are different in tone. However, both start by comparing those who enter the Kingdom of Heaven to children, and then make references to eyes, hands, and feet. In Matthew, Jesus suggests that these offending parts should be "cut off," whereas the passage in Thomas takes a different tone in describing spiritual cleansing and renewal:

From the Gospel of Thomas:

²²Jesus saw some babies nursing. He said to his disciples, "These nursing babies are like those who enter the (Father's) kingdom". They said to him, "Then shall we enter the (Father's) kingdom as babies?" Jesus said to them, "When you make the two into one, and when you make the inner like the outer and the outer like the inner, and the upper like the lower, and when you make male and female into a single one, so that the male will not be male nor the female be female, when you make eyes in place of an eye, a hand in place of a hand, a foot in place of a foot, an image in place of an image, then you will enter [the kingdom]."

== Commentary ==
Cornelius a Lapide makes the following note in his Great Commentary:

Christ bids us become like little children. Briefly, and to the point, does St. Hilary of Poitiers sum up their characteristics which ought to be imitated by believers. “They,” he says, “follow their father; they love their mother: they wish no evil to their neighbour; they regard not the care of riches; they are not wont to be insolent, nor to hate, nor to tell lies. They believe what they are told; they regard as true what they hear. Let us return, therefore, to the simplicity of little children, for when we have that, we bear about with us a likeness of the Lord’s humility.”

Friedrich Justus Knecht comments on the phrase “Suffer little children to come unto Me:”

This command was given for all times. Parents, and those who represent them, ought to bring their children to Jesus; they ought to take care that they are, first of all, admitted into the Church by holy Baptism; that they learn to know and love Him by means of a Christian education; and that, as soon as they are capable of receiving it, they are united to Him by Holy Communion, and strengthened in virtue by the imposition of hands and anointing of Confirmation.

Ger de Koning sums the Reformed approach in his King comments:

A little child has the special characteristics that he believes everything that is said to him, that he trusts those who take care of him, that he is of little significance in his own eyes and that he cannot defend himself if he is forced to leave.

All these characteristics are exactly those appropriate for the kingdom of God. Only if someone is willing to become a child with the appropriate characteristics can he receive the kingdom of God. Then he gets an eye for it, because receiving the kingdom means receiving the Lord Jesus. Those who don’t can’t enter. It is impossible to enter the kingdom with high thoughts about oneself. To enter the kingdom one must become small, stripped of all glory and greatness. That is the lesson of the rich ruler in the next history. Because he doesn’t become small, he can’t enter.

== See also ==
- Kingdom of heaven (Gospel of Matthew)
- Matthew 19
- Luke 18
