= Roman Charity (Rubens) =

Painting by Peter Paul Rubens

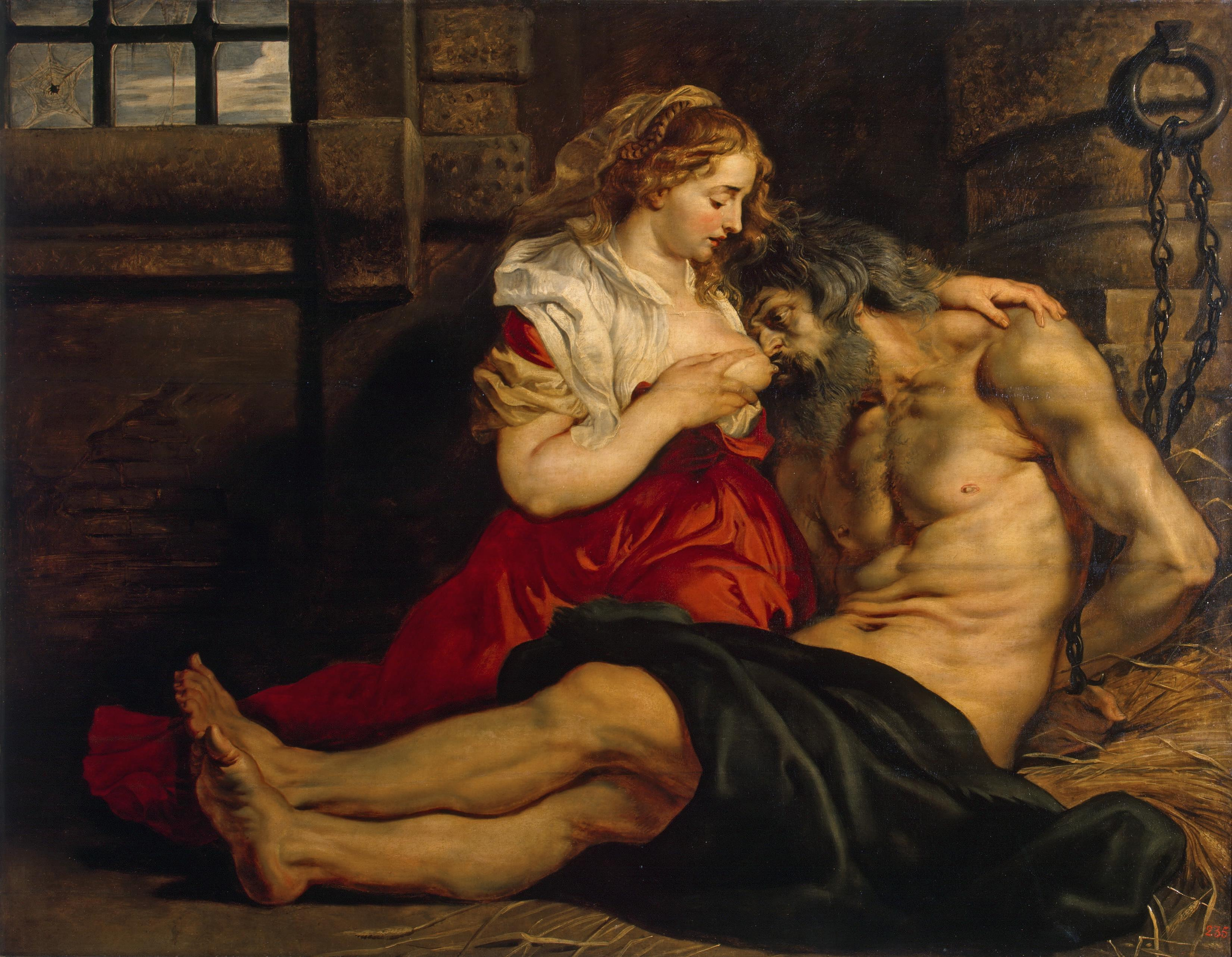
Roman Charity (c. 1612) by Rubens

Roman Charity is an oil on canvas painting by Peter Paul Rubens, executed c. 1612, now in the Hermitage Museum, in Saint Petersburg, for which it was bought from Koblenz's collection in Brussels in 1768. In 1828 D. A. Smitha of the Hermitage misattributed it as a copy. Later researchers agreed in 1864 and the work was placed in store until 1905, when a re-examination restored its autograph status.

It shows the subject Roman Charity, which Rubens also returned to in Cimon and Pero (1630, Rijksmuseum). The work appeared in the posthumous inventory of Rubens' works as Daughter Breastfeeding her Father in a Dungeon. It was sold to an unknown collector before coming into the possession of Carolus van den Bosch, Bishop of Bruges.

== See also ==
- Breastfeeding in art
