= Breastfeeding in art =

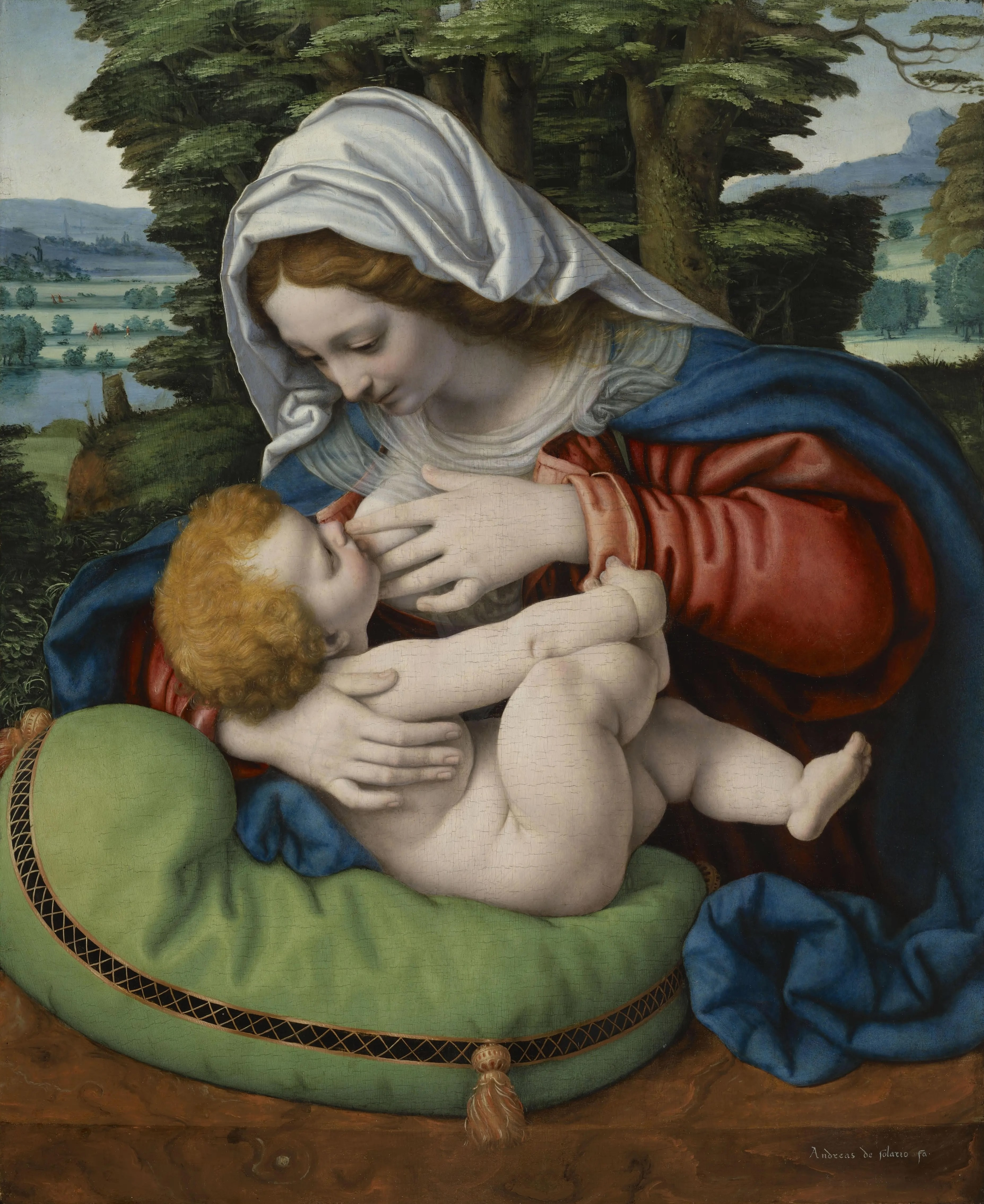
Madonna with the Green Cushion

Breastfeeding is "one of the most traditional motifs in art history", according to HuffPost.

The Breastfeeding Art Expo in Kelowna in 2017 featured breastfeeding-inspired artworks. In 2018, the De Montfort University in Leicester hosted an art exhibition of "brelfies" (breastfeeding selfies).

== Works ==
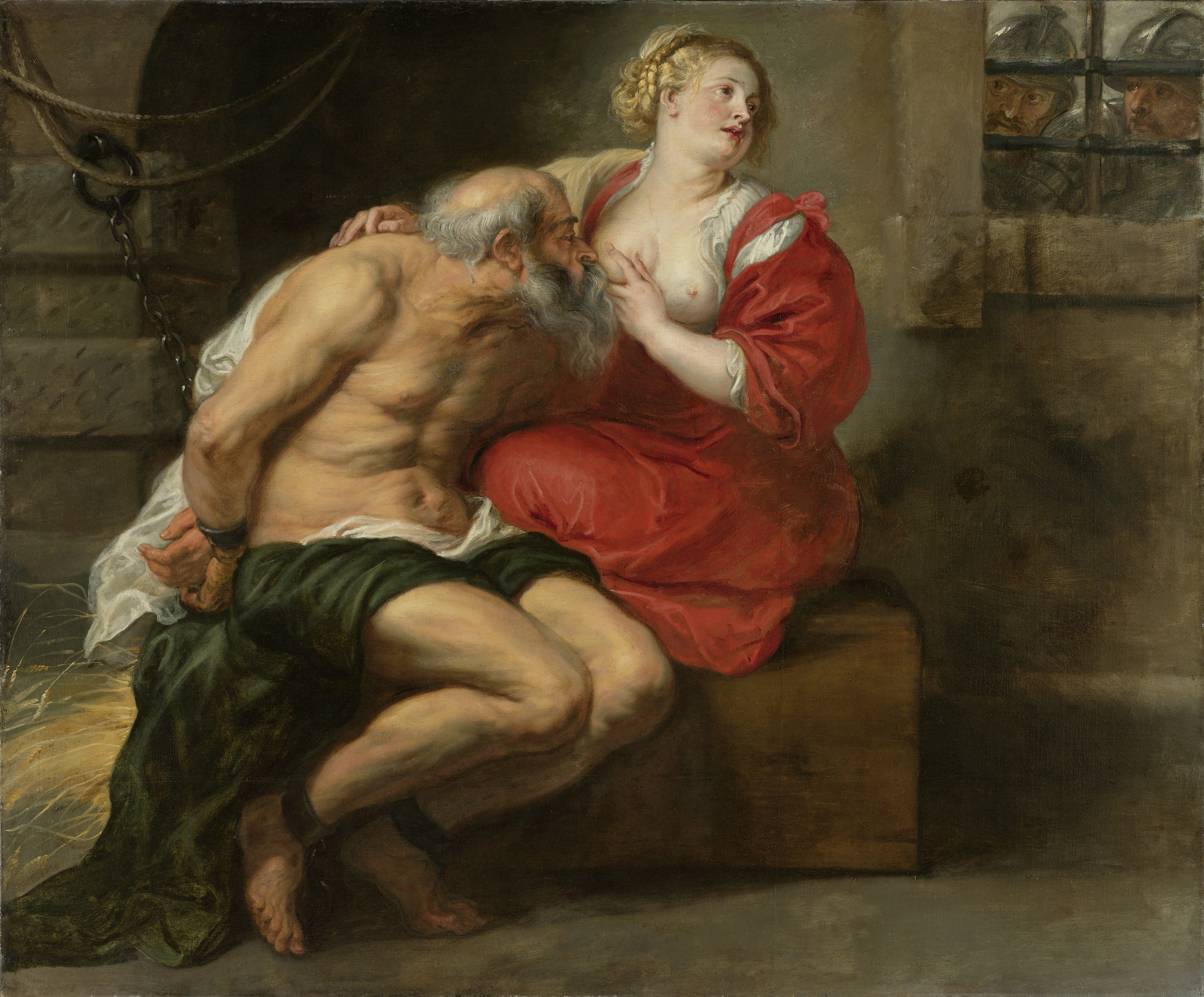
Cimon and Pero (Rubens)

Daniel Edwards's sculpture Landmark for Breastfeeding depicts Angelina Jolie breastfeeding her twins. In 2024, a mural by Peaball depicting a woman breastfeeding was painted in Derry. The work was commissioned by the North West Breastfeeding and Perinatal Support.

Notable works depicting breastfeeding include:

- Barrymore Madonna
- Brave Margot
- Caritas (Lucas Cranach the Elder)
- Caritas Romana (de Crayer, 1645)
- Caritas Romana (de Crayer)
- Charity (Reni, New York)
- Charity (Pollaiuolo)
- Christ Blessing the Children (Lucas Cranach the Elder)
- Cimon and Pero
- International breastfeeding symbol
- Madonna Litta
- Madonna of the Cat
- Madonna with the Green Cushion
- Melun Diptych
- Mother with Child
- Nursing Madonna
- The Birth of the Milky Way
- The Origin of the Milky Way
- Partisan Ballad
- Rest on the Flight into Egypt (David, Antwerp)
- Rest on the Flight into Egypt (David, New York)
- Roman Charity

== See also ==
- Body fluids in art
