= Caritas (Lucas Cranach the Elder) =

Painting by Lucas Cranach the Elder

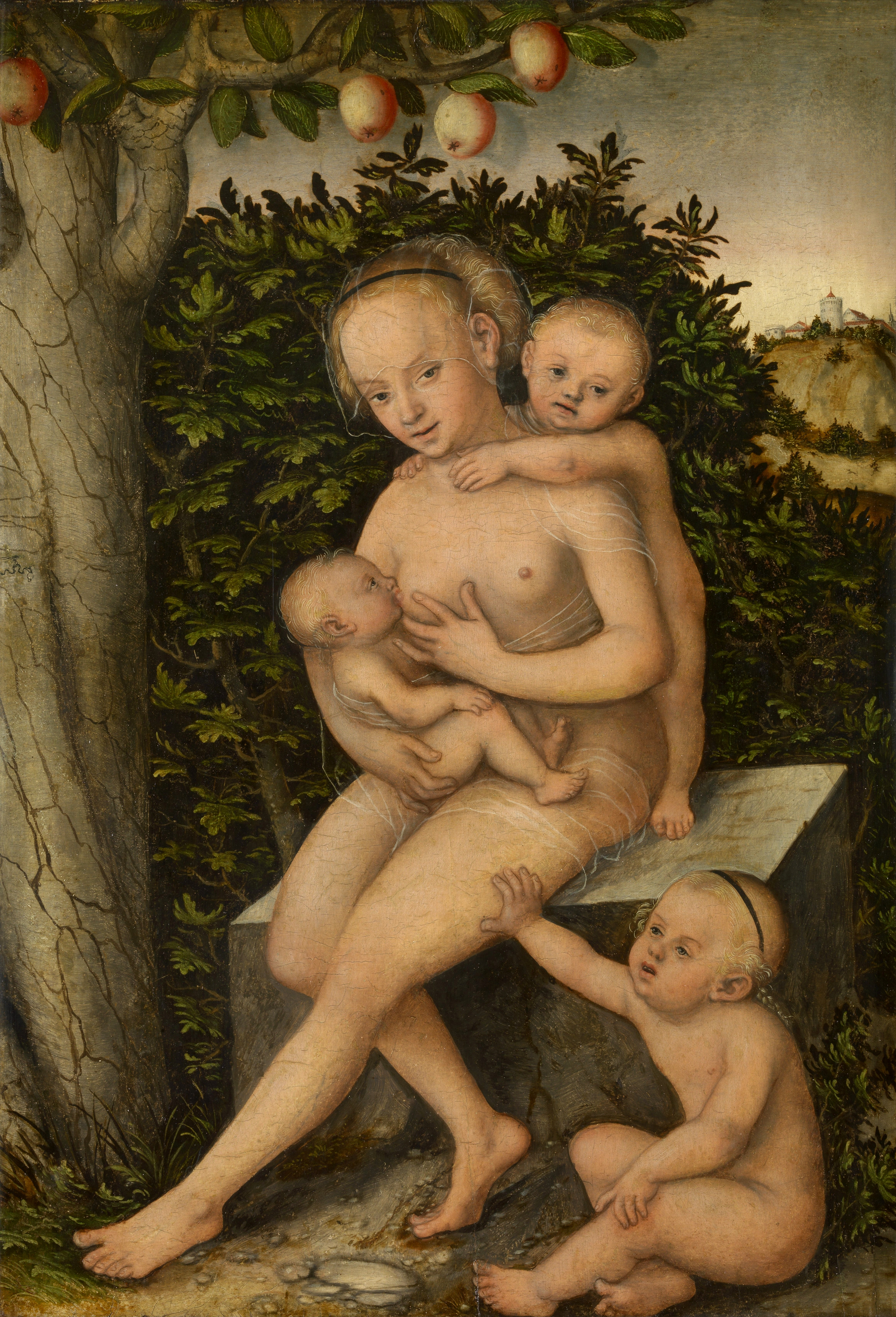
- Artist: Lucas Cranach the Elder
- Year: 16th century
- Medium: Oil on panel
- Dimensions: 50 cm × 34 cm (19.6 in × 13.3 in)
- Location: Royal Museum of Fine Arts; Antwerp

Caritas is an oil on panel painting by German painter Lucas Cranach the Elder. The painting is kept in the Royal Museum of Fine Arts, Antwerp.

== Background ==
Cranach, who has been credited as the most successful German artist of his time, was court painter to the Electors of Saxony for most of his career, and is known for his portraits of German princes, his collection of nudes, and his portraits of the leaders of the Protestant Reformation, whose cause he embraced with enthusiasm. He was a close friend of Martin Luther. Cranach also painted religious subjects, first in the Catholic tradition, and later trying to find new ways of conveying Lutheran religious concerns in art. He continued throughout his career to paint nude subjects drawn from mythology and religion.

Cranch's paintings of mythological scenes which nearly always feature at least one slim female figure, naked but for a transparent drape or a large hat, produced early in his career, show Italian influences including that of Jacopo de' Barberi, who was at the court of Saxony for a period up to 1505. They then become rare until after the death of Frederick the Wise. The later nudes are in a distinctive style which abandons Italian influence for a revival of Late Gothic style.

== Painting ==
A young mother — identified as Charity, the personification of benevolence — with her naked body covered only by a transparent gauze, breastfeeds a child. She is embraced by another child. A young boy is sitting on the ground in front of her and is touching her leg. She sits on a stone block beneath an apple tree. A mountainous landscape is visible in the background around the bush behind the young mother.

Max J. Friedländer and Jakob Rosenberg mentioned six different variations of this work. They date the Antwerp painting to after 1537.

== Interpretation ==
From 1529 onward, depictions of Charity on her own became part of Cranach’s work. In these paintings, Cranach isolated (and monumentalized) a subject, which before then had usually been integrated into a series of virtues and vices. Cranach was also an innovator in that his Charity allegories were more or less nude figures, since the transparent veil offered nothing more than a symbolic fig leaf, at the same time helping to increase the visual pleasure.

By representing the naked Caritas, or Charity, surrounded by three children, the protestant Cranach suffused his subject and the painting with a quality of motherly love. Cranach, however, was more concerned with physical representation rather than symbolistic aspects of painting. Cranach's nudes, part of his series featuring the same female sitter, are easily recognizable, and he glorified them many times by making them appear in mythological and biblical scenes.

== See also ==
- Breastfeeding in art
