= Barrymore Madonna =

Painting by Antonio da Correggio

Madonna and Child
- Year: 1508–1510
- Medium: oil paint, canvas
- Dimensions: 56.3 cm (22.2 in) × 41 cm (16 in)
- Location: National Gallery of Art
- Collection: Samuel H. Kress Collection

The Barrymore Madonna is a 1508–1510 painting by the Italian Renaissance artist Antonio da Correggio.

== History ==
It has been known since the 18th century, when it was probably in the collection of John Smith Barry (grandfather of Arthur Smith-Barry, 1st Baron Barrymore) at Marbury Hall near Northwich in Cheshire, UK. His heirs auctioned it at Sotheby's in London on 21 June 1933 as a work by Mantegna, by whom the young Correggio was strongly influenced. At that auction, it was bought by the Duveen Brothers, who then sold it in March 1937 to Samuel Henry Kress, who gave it to the new National Gallery of Art in Washington, where it now hangs.

It was reattributed to Correggio by Corrado Ricci in 1930 and that attribution was accepted by Roberto Longhi in 1958 and Arturo Carlo Quintavalle in 1970. However, Cecil Gould disagreed in 1976, quoting the inventories of the Kress collection in 1959, which still held it to be by Mantegna, and in 1968, which held it to be "circle of Mantegna, possibly Correggio".

== See also ==
- Breastfeeding in art
