= Caritas Romana (de Crayer, 1645) =

Painting by Gaspar de Crayer

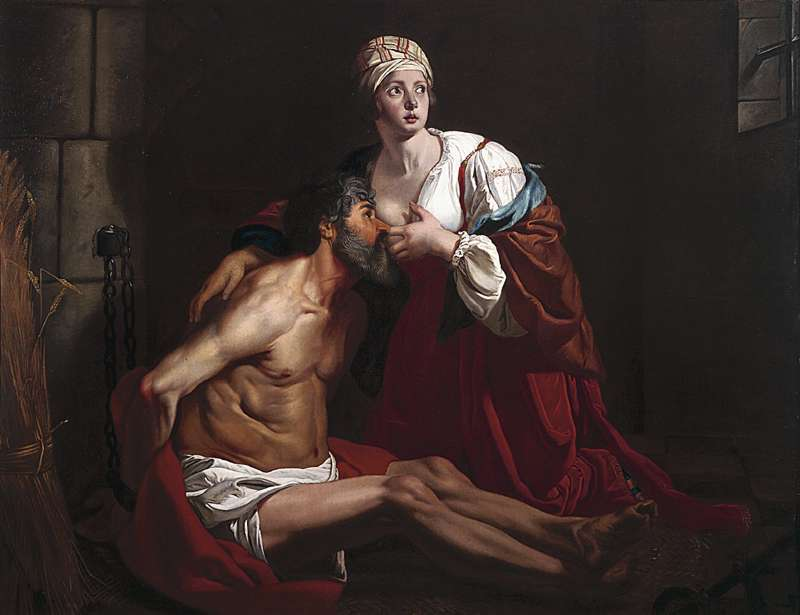
- Artist: Gaspar de Crayer
- Year: 1645
- Medium: Oil on canvas
- Dimensions: 160 cm × 205 cm (62.9 in × 80.7 in)
- Location: Private collection

Caritas Romana is an oil on canvas painting by Flemish painter Gaspar de Crayer. The painting was part of the Jan De Maere Gallery's collection up to 2003, and is today owned by an unknown collector. According to some sources, it was at the Dorotheum in 2007.

Another better known Caritas Romana by de Crayer, dated to ca. 1625, is housed at the Museum of Prado in Madrid.

== Subject ==
The subject matter of the painting is the exemplary episode of caritas as recounted by Valerius Maximus. In the story, part of Maximus' Factorum ac dictorum memorabilium, Pero, the daughter of Cimon, a starving man awaiting execution, is allowed by the jailer to enter the cell and visit him. Pero gives her starving father her breast.

== Painting ==
The scene depicted in the painting is set in Cimon's cell. Cimon, who occupies the center of the painting, is sitting with his hands tied and bound to the wall behind him, suckling at his daughter's breast. Pero is standing over her father, with her arm around his shoulder and her hand gently posed on his back.

In de Crayer's 1625 Caritas, instead, Pero's hand kindly holds her father's head. Pero's expression in the 1645 painting is anxious, at the possibility of being caught by the guards rather than anything else.

In the painting, the focus is on the two protagonists and central figures, while de Crayer's powerful chiaroscuro nothing but enhances the drama of the scene. The painting testifies to Caravaggio's influence on de Crayer, who, nonetheless, never traveled to Italy.

== See also ==
- Breastfeeding in art
