= Temple of Apollo Sosianus =

Roman temple in the Campus Martius

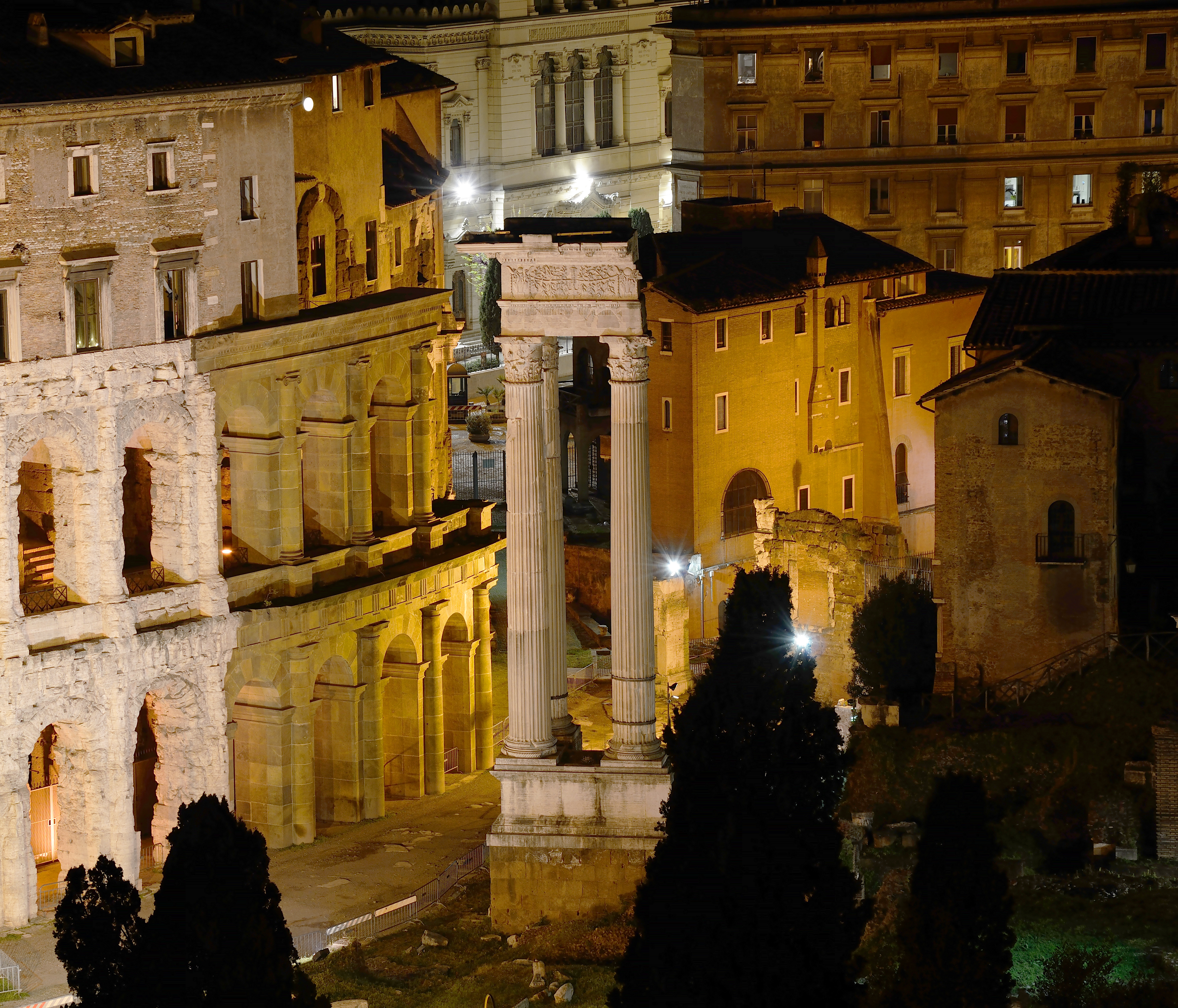
- The Temple of Apollo Sosianus

- Shown within Augustan Rome
- Interactive map of Temple of Apollo Sosianus

The Temple of Apollo Sosianus (previously known as the Apollinar and the temple of Apollo Medicus) is a Roman temple dedicated to Apollo in the Campus Martius, next to the Theatre of Marcellus and the Porticus Octaviae, in Rome, Italy. Its present name derives from that of its final rebuilder, Gaius Sosius.

== Location ==
The Apollinar and its successors can closely be linked to the site next to the theatre due to Asconius's reference to it being "outside the porta Carmentalis between the Forum Holitorium and the Circus Flaminius", Livy's placing it in the prata Flaminia (Flaminian meadows, as this area was then called) and other references placing it near to the forum, the Capitol and the theatre of Marcellus respectively.

All these indicate the presently-accepted site for this temple, just north of the theatre and east of the porticus Octaviae, on the street leading through the porta Carmentalis to the campus Martius, a little south of the present Piazza Campitelli.

== History ==
=== Republican era ===
The three columns of the temple which survive to full-height today belong to the Augustan rebuild, but the cult of Apollo had existed in this area since at least to the mid-5th century BC when an Apollinar (a sacred grove or altar) was recorded on this site. Since Apollo was a foreign cult, it thus legally had to be placed outside the pomerium, making it a regular spot for extra-pomerial senate meetings. (This was also Apollo's only temple in Rome until Augustus dedicated another on the Palatine Hill.)

The first temple building dates to 431 BC, when the consul Gaius Iulius Mento inaugurated one dedicated to Apollo Medicus (the doctor), in fulfilment of a vow to him during a plague of 433 BC. This building was restored in 353 BC, and perhaps in 179 BC, when the censor Marcus Aemilius Lepidus and his colleague let the contract for building a porticus from the temple to the Tiber, behind the temple of Spes. The censor's projects also included a nearby theatre. The shedding of tears for three days by a cult-statue of Apollo, cited among the prodigies at the death of the Younger Scipio, can only have occurred at this temple, there being no others to Apollo.

A neighbouring temple dedicated to Apollo's sister Diana probably dates to the late Republic, following the destruction of the Apollo temple's precinct in work on the theatre of Marcellus.

=== Sosian reconstruction ===
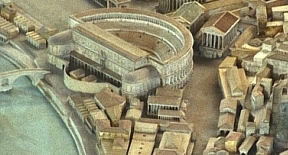
The Theater of Marcellus, the Forum Olitorium, and the temples of Bellona and Apollo, from Gismondi's c. 1:250 scale model of imperial Rome at the Museum of Roman Civilization

A radical reconstruction was begun by Gaius Sosius, probably just after his triumph in 34 BC. These building-works were themselves soon interrupted by the civil war between Octavian and Antony (with Sosius taking Antony's side), and only resumed some years later when Augustus was reconciled with Sosius. It was thus dedicated in the end to the name of the princeps, with the dedication day in the Augustan period of 23 September. Upon the construction of the theatre of Marcellus soon afterwards the temple's frontal staircase was demolished and replaced with two staircases on the sides of the "pronaos".

=== Late Roman ===
Only minor reconstructions are known after the Augustan phases, by the urban prefect Memmius Vitrasius Orfitus (356 - 359) and perhaps by Anicius Acilius Fortunatus Glabrio in the 420s. The temple would have been closed during the persecution of pagans in the late Roman Empire, when the Christian Emperors issued edicts prohibiting all non-Christian worship and sanctuaries.

=== Medieval and modern ===
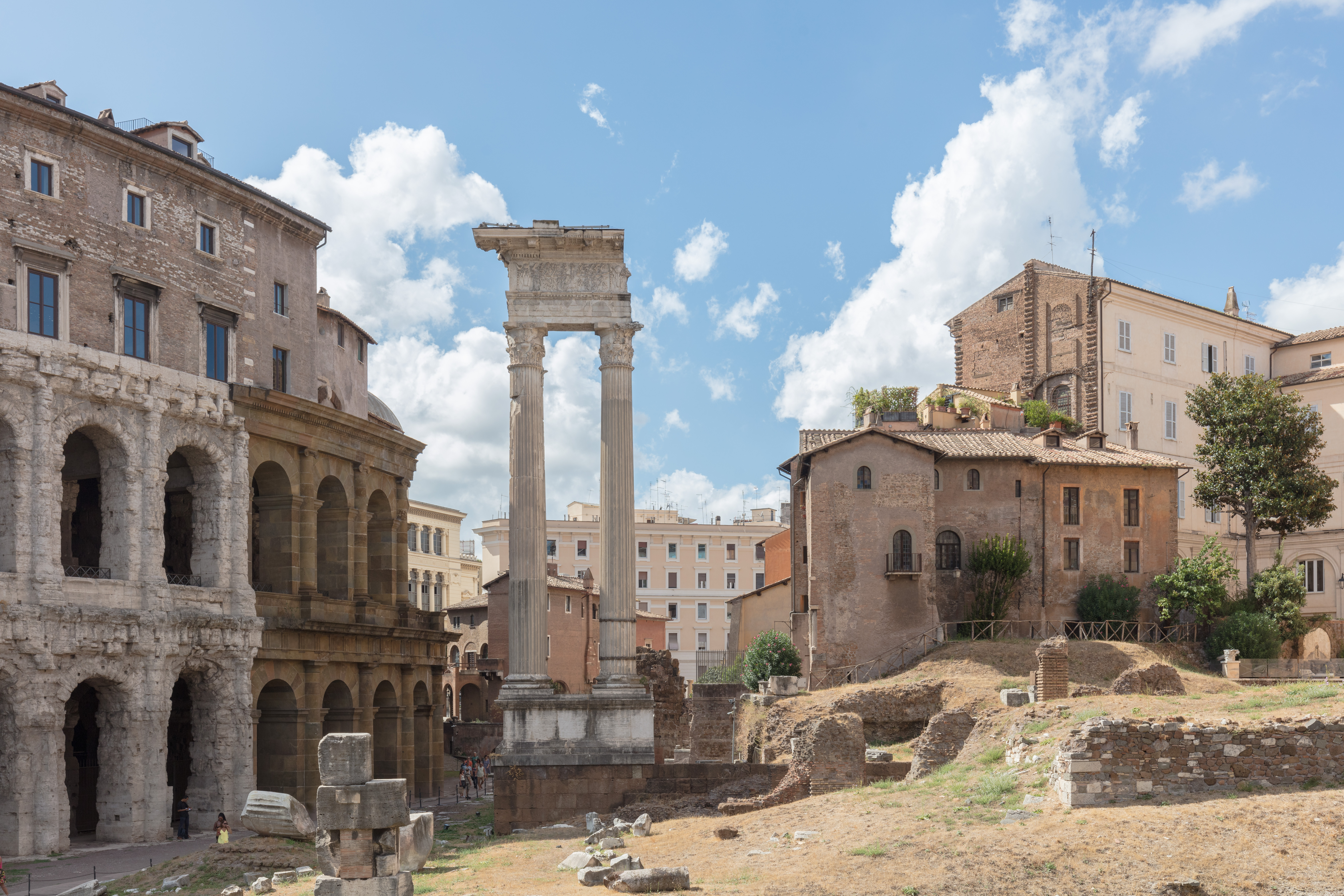
The Temple, with the Theatre of Marcellus on the left and Porticus Octavia at the backside

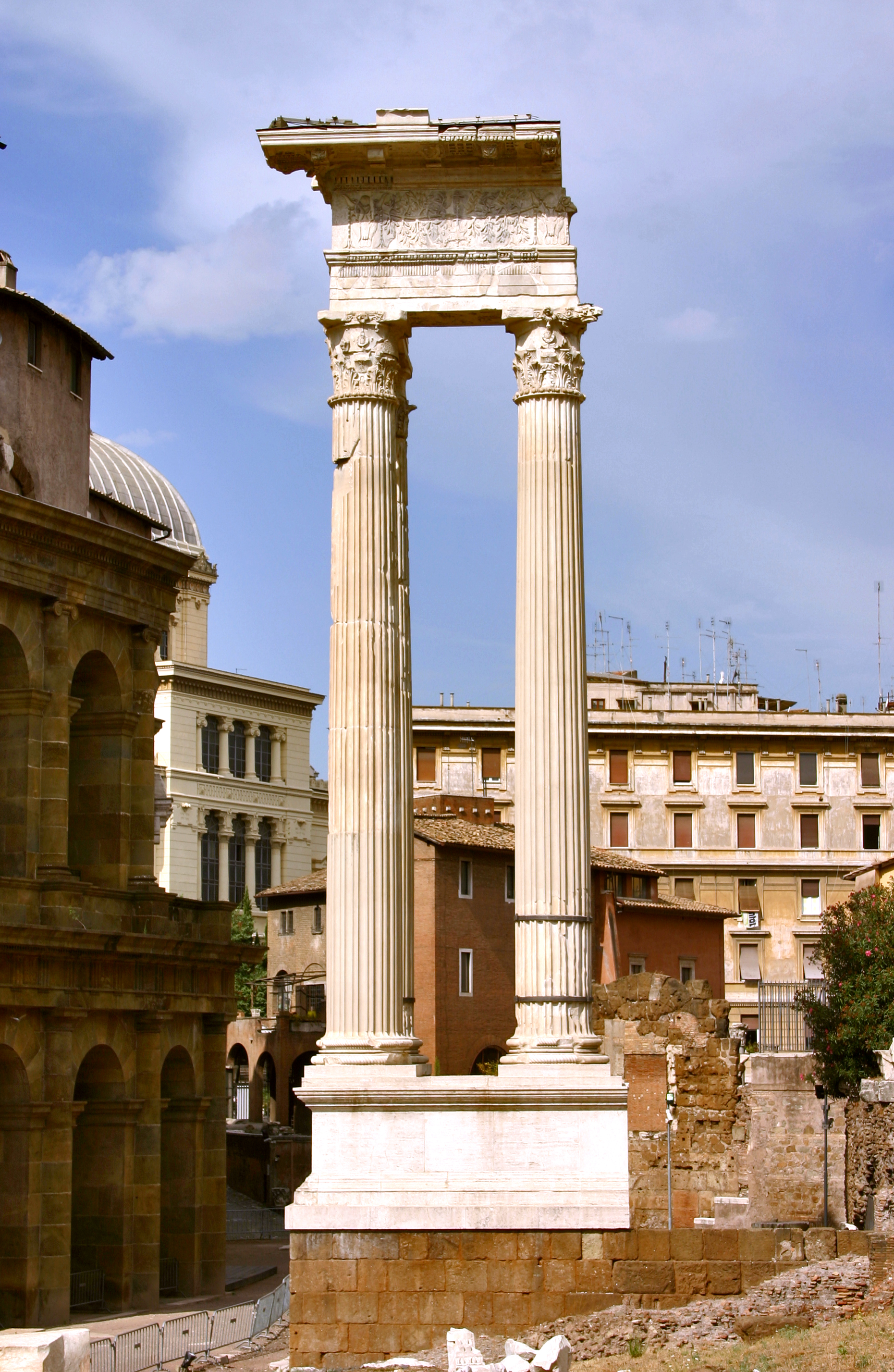
The three re-erected columns

The temple's ruins were occupied in the post-Roman period by medieval dwellings right up to the 1930s, when these were demolished between 1926 and 1932 to allow the theatre of Marcellus to be seen in isolation. In those same works the remains of the fallen colonnade were recovered in the very positions in which they had fallen, inside the arches of the theatre and as a result in 1937 and 1938 the podium's remains were excavated. In 1940 the fallen columns were raised on this podium, though probably not in their original positions.

=== Additional Works ===
Twice, Pliny speaks of works of art in this temple, probably referring to loot brought back from Greece by Sosius and placed within his reconstruction of the temple. These include:

- paintings by Aristides of Thebes
- several statues by Philiscus of Rhodes
- an Apollo Citharoedus by Timarchides
- a statue of Apollo in cedar wood from Seleucia
- the celebrated group of the Niobids (attributed by the ancients to Scopas or Praxiteles, now attributed to neither).

== Augustan Reconstruction ==
Between 37 and 32 BC, a large reconstruction of the pediment of the Temple of Apollo Sosianus occurred under Augustus, which was indicative of his larger plans to re-structure the architectural format of Circus Flaminius, an oval shaped section in the southern portion of Campus Mauritius. The result of this Augustan re-formatting was a tight architectural relationship between Apollo Sosianus, the Temple of Bellona, and the Theatre of Marcellus. This decision was intentional and indicative of the Greek god Apollo's influence on Roman life; Apollo was the center of life at the Circus Flaminius, as the space was used for theatrical performances at the Theatre of Marcellus, horse racing around the oval shaped perimeter of the Circus, and political speeches within the oval field.

=== Pedimental Reconstruction: Apollan Statue ===
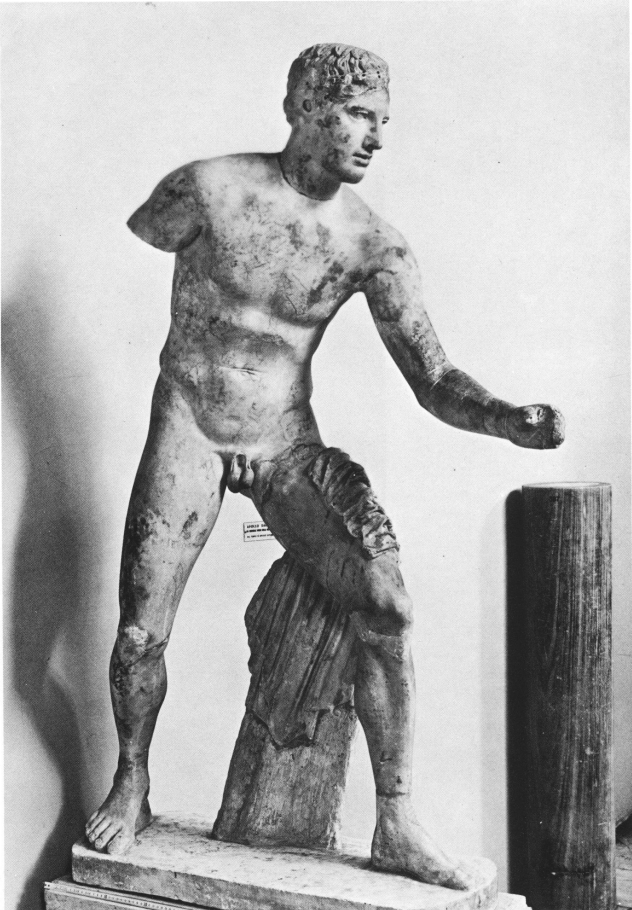
Apollan Statue recovered at the ruins of Circus Flaminus and later identified as a central pedimental sculpture.

One of the most famous sculptures recovered from the surrounding areas around Apollo Sosianus was a five-foot tall sculpture of an Apollo archer. While the original position of this sculpture has been the object of scholarly debate, as some authors believed that this work was originally placed in a niche within the temple cell, this theory was disproved with the discovery of “a very accentuated stucco which hid a quadrangular hole, by those that are normally used to fix the pedimental statues with a hook to the back wall.” Based on the location of this hole, scholars discovered that the Apollo statue would have been hung on the pediment with a profile view, and his left arm most likely held a shield while he held a sword in his right hand. This determination also solidified scholars distinction between this work as a warrior of Apollo versus that of Apollo himself, as the god Apollo is typically depicted with his arms raised, adorned with a bow and arrow. Also indicative of this distinction is the lack of “characterizing element” of Apollo, such as a braid behind the nape, a characteristic reserved for depictions of heroes and gods.

== Description ==
The building is oriented almost perfectly towards the south, differing from the orientation of the other neighbouring buildings, including the adjoining temple of Bellona.

The Augustan phase of the temple was made up of a podium under the columns and the cella walls, with its supporting parts made up of travertine blocks to carry the weight and the non-supporting parts merely of tuff blocks and cement. The remains of the podium wall surviving beneath the cloisters of Santa Maria in Campitelli – 13 metres long, over 4 high and over 2 thick – were assumed by Delbrück to be unquestionably a part of the original structure. Frank, however, maintains that though the cappellaccio tuff core may belong to the original building, the rest (besides some concrete with an opus reticulatum facing, attributable to the 34 BC phase) belongs to the 179 BC restoration. He argues this from the use in the remains' facing of tuff from Monte Verde, the southern end of the Janiculum Hill.

The temple's hexastyle elevation was formed of Carrara marble columns along the front and the two long sides of the pronaos, with those at the back made of plastered brick. This style was continued in travertine half-columns (plastered to look like marble) against the cella walls.

The facade's architrave was made up of blocks of travertine faced and supported with marble in the pittabanda style, rather than solid blocks of marble alone. In the same way the frieze was sculpted on slabs placed on the supporting structure. The capitals are Corinthian with extra vegetable motifs (in Italian, "corinzieggiante", no English equivalent), and the frame presents a very protruding ceiling supported by brackets.

The temple's main pediment was decorated with sculptures removed from a classical temple in Greece. These date to c. 450 - 425 BC and show an amazonomachy. They are now preserved at Centrale Montemartini of the Capitoline Museums.

The cella's interior walls were decorated with a double order of column shafts in African marble, the lower one with a frieze representing stages of the battles included in the triple triumph of Octavian in 29 BC. Between the columns were aediculae with column-shafts in different coloured marbles (giallo antico, pavonazzetto and portasanta) and with tympana in unusual shapes (triangular, half-moon and 'pagoda'-form triangular).

=== Art-historical analysis ===
The architectural decoration of the surviving phase includes different and unusual motifs (e.g. the grooves of the column trunks, which are not all equal, but alternately wider and narrower). This shows a moment at which a new decorative style is being elaborated, amalgamating the Italic architectural style of the Republic (as shown, for example, in the Temple of Portunus) with the influences of the Hellenistic Greek East, emphasizing the old values of Augustus's new status quo whilst showing the regime's innovative cultural credentials. This style would later be codified in the Forum of Augustus. Other new features include the insertion of decorative elements meant to celebrate Octavian, such as the laurel in the frieze and capitals.

The temple also dates from the earliest period in which marble was used in bulk for Roman public buildings, and represents a switch-over period from the traditional technologies of plastered tuff and travertine, with experimentation in ways of working with the new materials. Indeed, marble is only used on the facade, with the architects as yet uncertain of its load-bearing possibilities, as seen in the faced tuff frieze, lintel and capitals.

== Other buildings in the area ==
Located near the Temple of Apollo Sosianus is a concrete circular foundation, found among other remains of Flavian date. Its proximity to the temple may suggest that these remains were once its perirrantherion, a sacred space used for the temple's cult, and later on, likely used for lustra.

The triumphal portico (a long portico stretching a mile between the Servian Wall's porta Carmentalis and the Trigarium) passed the corners of the temples of Apollo and Bellona, where major remains of it can be seen. Others are visible in the direction of the Capitol, along the present 'Via del Teatro di Marcello', facing the church of San Nicola in Carcere.

== See also ==
- List of Ancient Roman temples

== Notes ==
Preceded by Temple of Apollo Palatinus	Landmarks of Rome; Temple of Apollo Sosianus	Succeeded by Temple of Hadrian
