= Temple of Janus =

Temple of Janus may refer to:

- Temple of Janus (Roman Forum), in the Roman Forum, Rome
- Temple of Janus (Forum Holitorium), in the Forum Holitorium, Rome
- Temple of Janus (Autun), the Gallo-Roman temple, not truly dedicated to Janus, located in Autun, France
