= Temple of Piety =

Temple in Rome (181–44 BC)

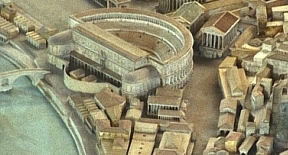
The Temple of Piety west of the Roman vegetable market and southeast of the Theater of Marcellus in Gismondi's scale model of imperial Rome, Museum of Roman Civilization

The Temple of Piety (Latin: Aedes Pietatis) was a Roman temple dedicated to the goddess Pietas, a deified personification of piety. It was erected in 181 BC at the northern end of the Forum Olitorium, the Roman vegetable market, and demolished in 44 BC to make room for the building eventually known as the Theater of Marcellus. It seems to have been rebuilt and its services continued well into the imperial period, although this is disputed by some scholars.

== History ==
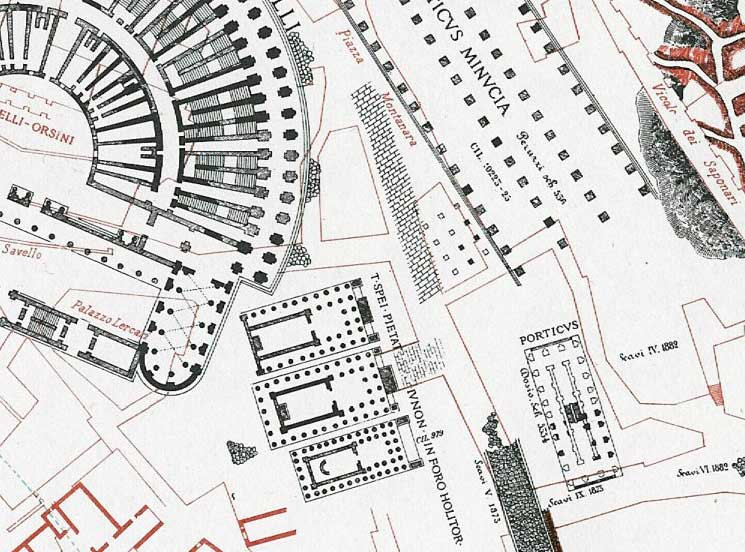
Lanciani's plan of the temples beside the Forum Olitorium based on the Severan Forma Urbis Romae, placing the Temple of Piety between the Temples of Spes and Juno Sospita in the early 3rd century

The creation of the temple was solemnly vowed by the plebeian consul and new man Manius Acilius Glabrio at the Battle of Thermopylae in 191 BC, where his legion defeated the Seleucid emperor Antiochus III during the Roman–Seleucid war. The reason for the dedication is unclear in surviving sources, although some modern scholars have suggested he was inspired by an act of filial piety during the battle, possibly by his own son.

Acilius Glabrio began construction but became dishonored during a contentious censorial election—he withdrew from the election after his competition Marcus Porcius Cato convincingly alleged he had embezzled plunder from his Greek campaign—and never again held high office. It was completed and consecrated by his son of the same name in 181 BC, who was named a duumvir for that purpose. (Note: It has been generally—but apparently mistakenly—assumed that the son's dedication meant that Acilius Glabrio the Elder was dead by 181 bc. In fact, apart from the seemliness of the son completing a father's temple to piety, indirect evidence seems to indicate that the father lived until at least the mid-170s. Further, during this era, all temples vowed by consuls seem to have only been dedicated directly by them once they were further appointed censor, with duumvirs otherwise being appointed for the purpose as a means of restoring greater senatorial control over civic construction and funds.) The temple was located near the northwestern end of the Forum Olitorium, the Roman vegetable market near the Carmental Gate west of the Capitoline Hill. The temple included a golden statue of the consul, the first gold statue of a Roman citizen in the city.

The temple became associated with Roman Charity, the Greek legend of a daughter who breastfed her imprisoned father or mother, probably through the presence of the Columna Lactaria in the forum. This "Wetnurse Column" was a place where poor infants could be given milk until they were weaned; it may have inspired the placement of the temple itself or the temple may have been built on or near the site of a former prison. A separate version of the story stated that the temple was built over the former home of the family, which had supposedly been maintained at state expense after the event. The story later became a common theme of Western European painting in the early modern period, particularly the Baroque. The temple was also sometimes associated with the piety of Gaius Flaminius towards his father, who pulled him from the rostra despite the inviolability of the tribunes of the plebs.

The temple seems to have been the one "in the Circus Flaminius" struck by lightning and greatly damaged in 91 or 90 BC, although some scholars dispute this point. When Julius Caesar became dictator for life, he planned to erect a theater larger than Pompey's in the area and demolished the neighborhood northwest of the Forum Olitorium—including the Temple of Piety—to create room in 44 BC. His nephew and adopted son Augustus later completed construction as the Theater of Marcellus.

The temple was moved or fully rebuilt, however, as its observances in the Forum Olitorium continued to be noted well into the imperial period, when it was part of the city's IX Region. The detailed early 3rd-century Severan Forma Urbis Romae and Lanciani's modern revision of it place this reconstructed temple on the west side of the forum between the Temples of Hope and Juno Sospita. Other scholars—ignoring the temple's continued existence—make the large central temple Juno Sospita's, move Hope's temple to its south, and make the northern temple Janus's.

== See also ==
- List of Ancient Roman temples
- Forum Olitorium
