= Temple of Bellona, Rome =

Former temple in Rome, Italy

Temple of Bellona
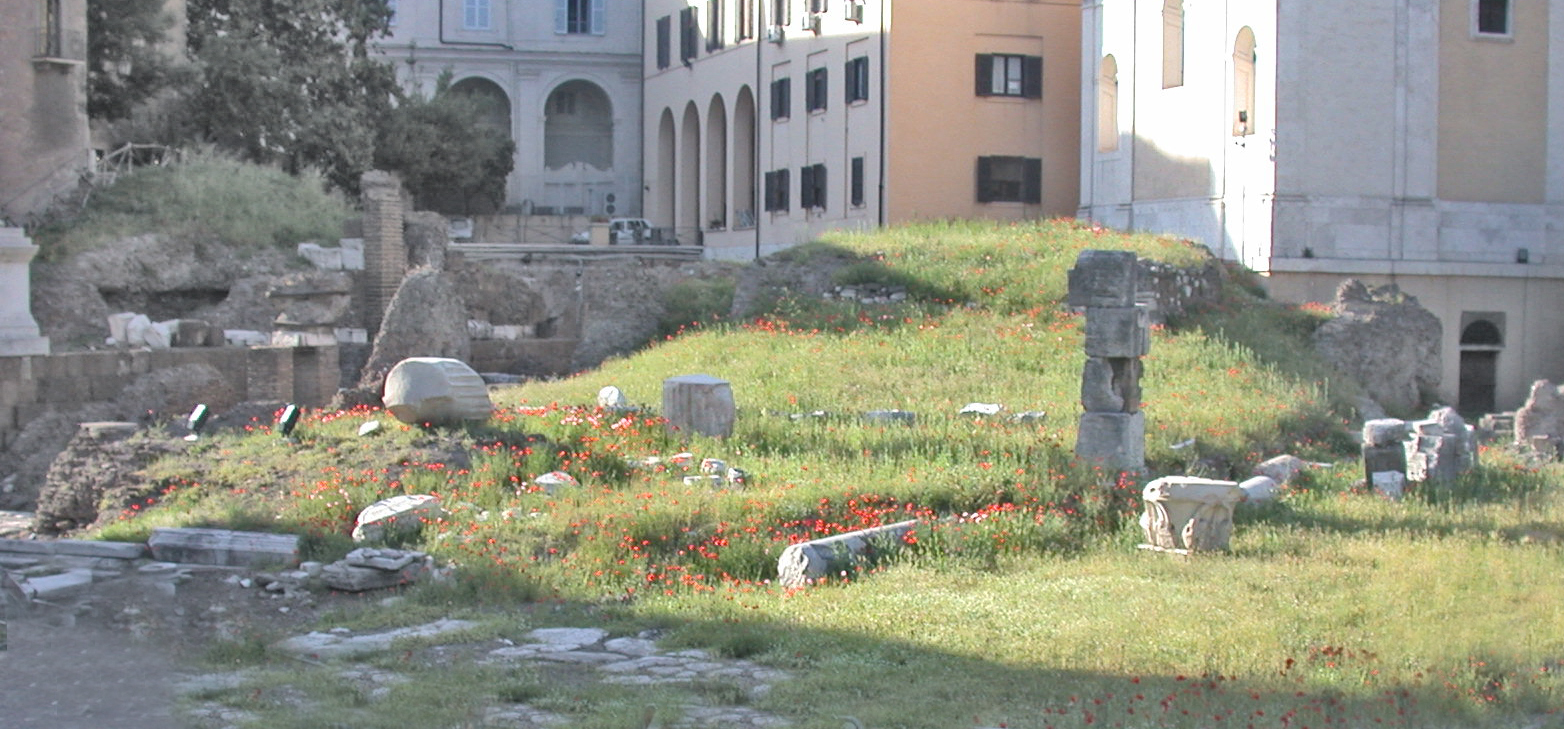
- The Temple podium

- Shown in ancient Rome
- Interactive map of Temple of Bellona
- 41°53′33″N 12°28′48″E

The Temple of Bellona was a temple dedicated to the goddess of war Bellona in ancient Rome. It was located at the northern end of the Forum Olitorium, the Roman vegetable market, near the Carmental Gate. The Temple of Apollo Sosianus and the Theater of Marcellus were located nearby.

== History ==
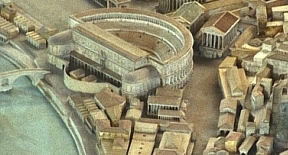
The Theater of Marcellus, Forum Olitorium, and the temples of Apollo and Bellona, from Gismondi's c. 1:250 scale model of imperial Rome at the Museum of Roman Civilization

It was first vowed in 296 BC by Appius Claudius Caecus during the third Samnite War, in the area of the later circus Flaminius, outside the pomerium but close to the Servian Wall, allowing it to accommodate extraordinary meetings of the Senate which involved foreign embassies from non-allies or returning or departing generals, neither of which were allowed within the pomerium - for example, the farewell to the proconsul on his departure for his allotted province. Appius's descendant Appius Claudius Pulcher (the consul of 79 BC) rehoused the imagines clipeatae ("images on shields") of his ancestors there, to advertise his descent from its founder.

The temple is depicted in the Forma Urbis Romae of the 3rd century.

=== Archeology ===
The temple – long considered lost – was identified with the remains of a podium recovered in the 1930s building works to enable the nearby Theatre to be seen in isolation. These remains belong to a reconstruction in the Augustan period which is not mentioned by the literary sources but is probably related to the transformation of the area during the construction of the Theatre at that time. Augustus (with links to the temple's founders via his Claudian wife) may have funded the rebuilding, or the dedicator may have been yet another Appius Claudius Pulcher (consul of 38 BC, conqueror of the Hirpini and loyal ally and father-in-law to Augustus).

These podium remains are made up of the cement infill between the load-bearing structures. (Those structures were constructed from opus quadratum blocks, looted for reuse after the temple was abandoned and now lost.) The structure of the church of Santa Rita da Cascia in Campitelli by Carlo Maderno was moved onto this podium from the slopes of the Capitol at the time of the 1930s excavation and work on the Capitol.

The surviving remains and plan of the temple on the Forma Urbis Romae show that it had columns along all sides of the cella (with six - i.e. hexastyle - along the shorter sides, and nine along the long sides) and had a frontal staircase up onto the podium. The temple's facade, like that of the neighbouring temple of Apollo, was part Carrara marble, part plastered travertine.

== The Columna Bellica ==
In front of the temple was a column used in the archaic Roman ceremony for declaring war involved hurling a spear from Roman territory towards enemy territory. However, when for the first time Rome had to declare war on a state whose territory did not border her own (i.e. Pyrrhus of Epirus), it was hard to see how this rite could be carried out. A prisoner of war was therefore forced to hold a small piece of land in the area of the circus Flaminius, where a column was raised (perhaps in wood) as a symbolical representation of the hostile territory and a spear then hurled against the column. This new procedure was then used on all subsequent occasions (the last well-known example is in 179 AD, under Marcus Aurelius).

A circular area with the paving restored in front of this temple was interpreted in the excavations as the place where this column was sited, on the basis of literary references. This is now interpreted as where the perirrhanterion (for lustrali at the end of campaigns) was sited before the temple of Apollo was built.

== See also ==
- Temple of Bellona (Ostia)
- List of Ancient Roman temples
