= Caritas Romana (de Crayer) =

Painting by Gaspar de Crayer

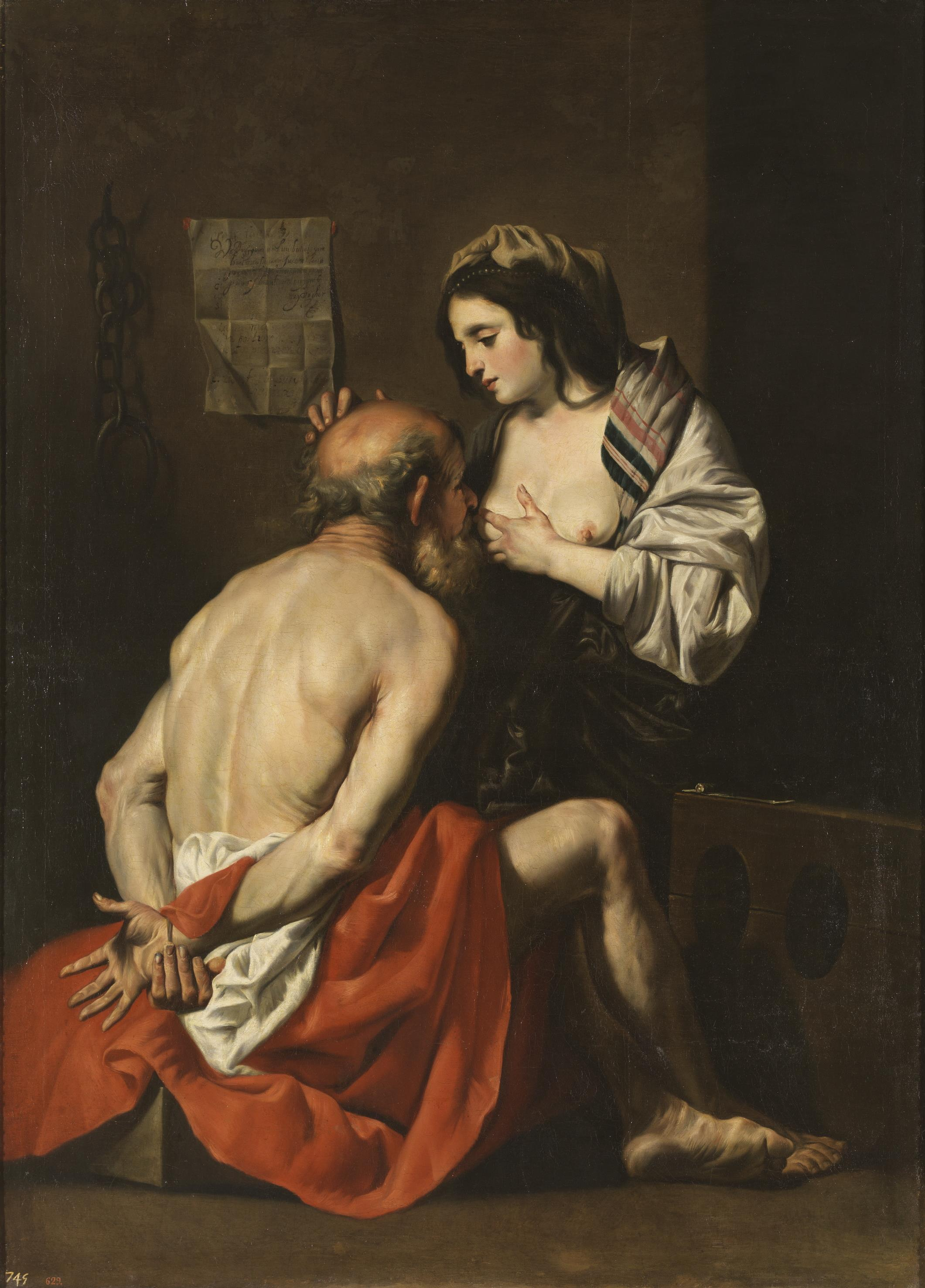
- Artist: Gaspar de Crayer
- Year: c. 1625
- Medium: Oil on canvas
- Dimensions: 198 cm × 144 cm (77.9 in × 56.6 in)
- Location: Museo del Prado; Madrid

Caritas is an oil on canvas painting by Flemish painter Gaspar de Crayer. The painting is in the collection of the Museo del Prado in Madrid.

== Subject ==
The subject of the painting is the exemplary story of Roman Charity. The story, part of the Factorum ac dictorum memorabilium, was written down by the ancient Roman historian Valerius Maximus. Maximus' story tells of a certain Cimon, an aged man starving to death in prison. His daughter, Pero, is permitted by the jailer to visit her starving father, and she suckles him. The story exemplifies daughterly love.

A painting in the Temple of Piety ancient Rome reportedly depicted the scene. Wall paintings and terracotta statues from the first century, excavated in Pompeii, suggest that the visual representations of Pero and Cimon might have been common in Ancient Rome. It is difficult to say whether said representations were created in response to Maximus's story or preceded and possibly inspired his story. Among the Romans, the theme echoed Juno's breastfeeding of the adult Hercules, an Etruscan myth.

== Background ==
De Crayer's early style followed the 16th century tradition of Antwerp artists such as Marten de Vos and Hendrik de Clerck. This style was characterized by an unnatural perspective and the crowding of long wooden figures in the foreground. From 1618, the painter came under the influence of Rubens. The level of borrowing of motifs from Rubens suggests that he had some contract with the workshop of Rubens from which de Crayer might have drawn inspiration for some of his subjects and models. The influence is shown in a more monumental rendering of figures in more balanced compositions.

Between 1638 and 1648 de Crayer's compositions started to display a lighter tonality and his figures became softer and more sentimental in appearance. This may have been influenced by the later work of Rubens. His work also showed a trace of the Venetian 16th-century masters, in particular Titian and Paolo Veronese. De Crayer, however, never visited Italy and he mostly knew their work through the prints of Agostino Carracci.

In later works, the influence of Caravaggio is also clear. De Crayer, who neither studied in nor visited Italy, had to reinterpret the Italians' approaches from secondary sources. The clearest influence on the Prado's Caritas, reportedly painted in early 1625, is that of Rubens.

== Painting ==
The painting depicts the dramatic climax of Maximus' story. The starving Cimon reclines in the lap of his young daughter who has bared her breasts and is suckling him. The setting is Cimon's cell. There is a notice affixed to the wall, just above Pero's fingers on the 2-dimensional surface of the painting. Her fingers gently touch her father's head. There are some chiaroscuro effects in the painting, and the sensuality of Pero's mien, rather than her uncovered breast, contrasts with the devotion the painting exudes.

== See also ==
- Breastfeeding in art
