= Acilius Glabrio =

Acilius Glabrio may refer to:

- Manius Acilius Glabrio (disambiguation)
- Marcus Acilius Glabrio (consul 33 BC)
- Anicius Acilius Glabrio Faustus, Roman senator

== See also ==
- Acilia gens
