= Temple of Janus (Forum Holitorium) =

Ancient religious monument in Rome, Italy

- Aedes Iani (Latin)
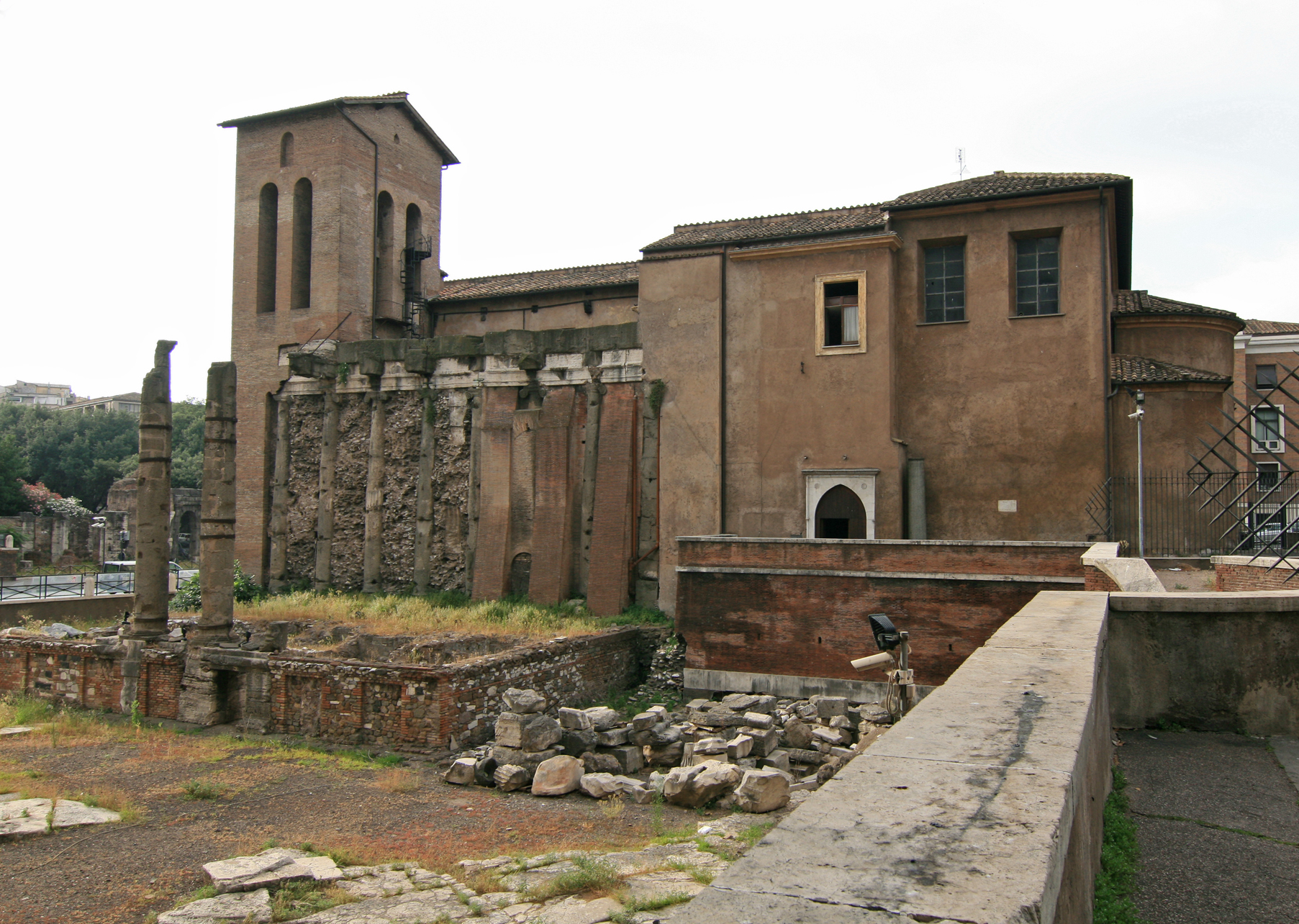
- The church of San Nicola in Carcere incorporating the remains of a temple

- Shown within Augustan Rome
- Interactive map of Temple of Janus
- 41°53′29″N 12°28′48″E
- Periods: 3rd century BC
- Cultures: Ancient Rome
- Location: Rome, Italy

Site notes
- Length: 26 metres (85 ft)
- Width: 15 metres (49 ft)

The Temple of Janus (Latin: Aedes Iani) at the Forum Holitorium was a Roman temple dedicated to the god Janus, located between the Capitoline Hill and the Tiber River near the Circus Flaminius in the southern Campus Martius. The temple was built during the First Punic War, after the Temple of Janus in the Roman Forum.

== History ==
The temple was built by Gaius Duilius in 3rd century BC after the 260 BC Roman victory at Mylae. It was probably built over an earlier shrine. Allegedly, the Senate was forbidden from meeting in the temple because their decree that the Fabii should go to the siege of Veii was made in a temple of Janus, although some scholars consider this apocryphal. There were annual festivals at the temple on the Portunalia (17 August), the day of its initial dedication.

During the early imperial period, Augustus began a restoration of the temple that was completed by his adopted heir Tiberius on 18 October AD 17. Augustus provided the temple with an Egyptian Greek statue of the god by Scopas or Praxiteles, probably Scopas's Two-Headed Hermes (Έρμης Δικέφαλος, Hermēs Diképhalos; Hermes Dicephalus). Thereafter, its annual festival was held in October.

== Location ==
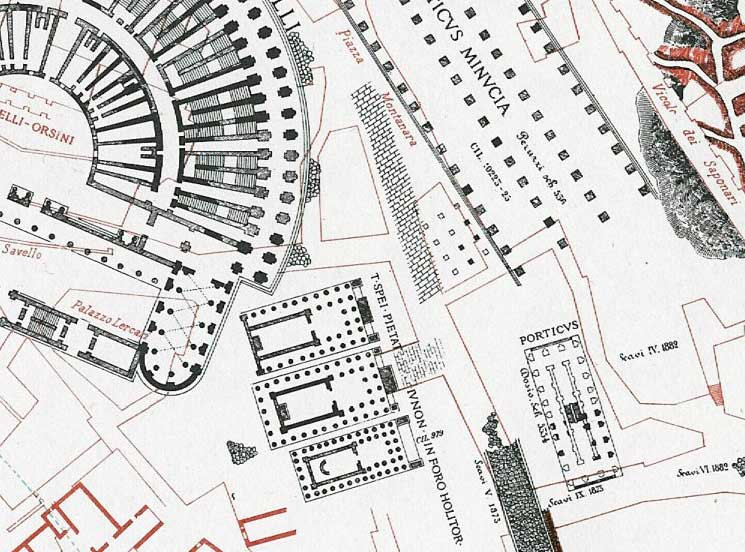
The map of the Forum Holitorium in Lanciani's revision of the Severan Forma Urbis Romae, identifying the vegetable market temples as (north to south), the Temples of Hope, Piety, and Juno Sospita.

The temple is known to have stood near the Roman vegetable market (Forum Holitorium) "at" or "beside the Theatre of Marcellus" (ad or iuxta theatrum Marcelli) (Note: Jordan considers this statement by Servius an interpolation, although this does not seem warranted by Thilo's apparatus criticus. It is more likely a scholar conflated this temple with the Temple of Janus at the bottom of the Argiletum when they wrote "sacrarium hoc, id est belli portas, Numa Pompilius fecit circa imum Argiletum iuxta theatrum Marcelli." This is the second of the alternatives suggested by Wissowa.) and "outside the Carmental Gate" (extra portam Carmentalem).

There are known to have been three contiguous temples from the Late Republic on the west side of the Forum Holitorium in the area of the current church of San Nicola in Carcere. The early 3rd-century Severan Forma Urbis Romae & Lanciani's 20th-century revision make these temples (from north to south) the Temples of Hope, Piety, and Juno Sospita. Other sources make the northern temple the Temple of Janus, the central temple Hope's, and the southern temple Juno Sospita's. The Italian government currently considers it likely but uncertain that the northern temple was Janus's and believes the central temple was Juno Sospita's and the southern temple Hope's.

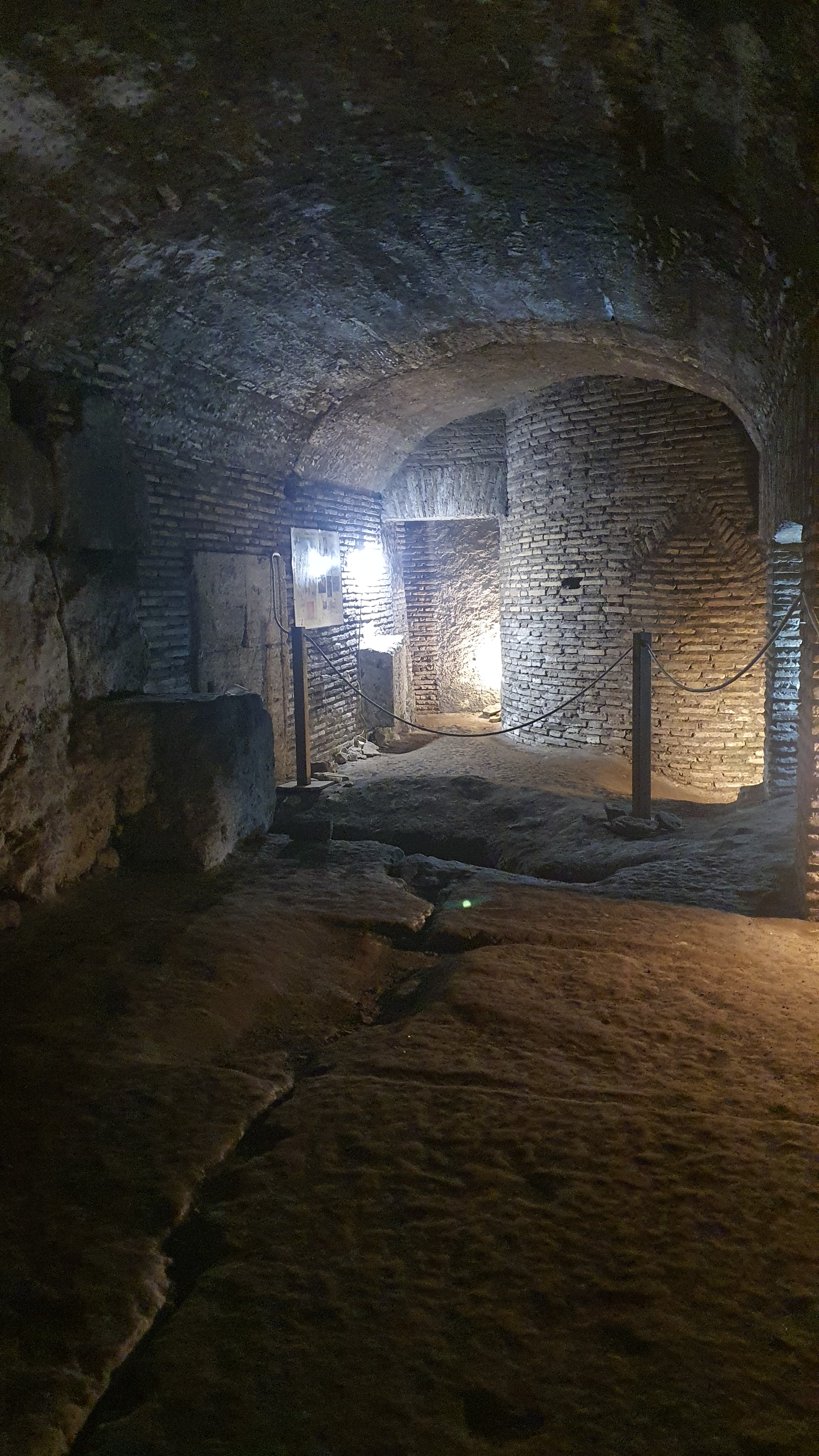
Remains at the basement of the church of Nicola

== Description ==
The ruins of the northernmost of the three ancient temples lie to the right of the facade of San Nicola. The principal remains are seven columns in tuff, a typical material for monuments of the Late Republic and early Empire, incorporated with their architrave into the right side of the church and two other free-standing columns near the Theatre of Marcellus. This temple was about 26 metres (85 ft) in length and 15 metres (49 ft) in width before its destruction. It had a Ionic hexastyle pronaos and featured another row of six columns behind the facade and one of nine on the long side. It lacked a rear colonnade (posticum), since the peristasis of columns did not cover that side. The temple was entirely covered with peperino like the one used for the Temple of Hadrian and rested on a basement of concrete covered with travertine. The columns and capitals were made of marble as well, unlike the nearby Temple of Portunus which had a stucco covering.

== See also ==
- List of Ancient Roman temples

== Notes ==
Preceded by Temple of Hercules Victor	Landmarks of Rome; Temple of Janus	Succeeded by Temple of "Minerva Medica"
