= Gaius Sosius =

1st-century BC Roman general and politician

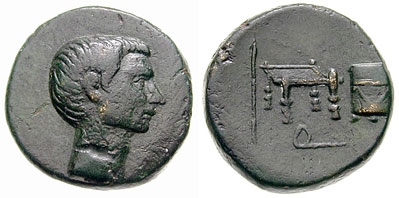
- Circa 38 BC.
- Years active: fl. 39–17 BC, possibly still alive as late as AD 6
- Office: Governor of Syria and Cilicia; Consul (32 BC); Quindecimvir sacris faciundis
- Children: 1
- Military career
- Allegiance: Mark Antony
- Wars: Siege of Jerusalem; Bellum Siculum; War of Actium
- Awards: Roman triumph (34 BC)

Gaius Sosius (fl. 39–17 BC) was a Roman general and politician who featured in the wars of the late Republic as a staunch supporter of Mark Antony. Under the latter's patronage he held important state offices and military commands, serving as governor of Syria and leading the expedition to install Herod as king of Judea. Sosius was consul in the year 32 BC, when the Second Triumvirate lapsed and open conflict erupted between the triumvirs Antony and Octavian. Upon taking office, Sosius opposed Octavian in the Senate, for which he was forced to flee Rome.

Joining Antony in the Eastern Mediterranean, Sosius became one of his lieutenants in the ensuing civil war. He commanded part of the fleet of Antony and Cleopatra at the battle of Actium in 31 BC, following which he was taken captive. Receiving a pardon, he was later rehabilitated and enrolled into a college of priests by the emperor Augustus. Sosius oversaw the rebuilding of the temple of Apollo Sosianus in Rome, which came to be named after him, and appears to have acquired significant wealth. He may have lived late into Augustus's reign.

== Life ==
=== Early career ===
Gaius Sosius was likely of Picentine background, and his father, also called Gaius Sosius, was the first recorded Roman senator of the family. He came to prominence during the time of the Second Triumvirate (43–32 BC) in service of the triumvir Mark Antony, of whom he became a devoted supporter. Sosius served as Antony's quaestor (treasurer) sometime between 41 and 39 BC, and in that capacity was stationed at a Roman naval base and mint in Zacynthus, one of the Ionian Islands west of the Peloponnese. In 39 BC, the triumvirs designated him to the office of consul for 32 BC. Sosius then accompanied Antony on an administrative tour of the eastern Roman provinces in 38 BC and was appointed by him governor of Syria and Cilicia. In this new capacity, he subdued the intransigent island city of Aradus in northern Phoenicia, and, at Antony's command, installed Rome's ally Herod as king of the Jews by besieging the incumbent Antigonus at Jerusalem.

Upon completion of the siege, Sosius was acclaimed as imperator by his troops. According to Josephus, Sosius 'humiliated' the captured Antigonus and was only stopped from fully looting the city after Herod interceded with large gifts to him and the troops. Towards the end of 36 BC, Sosius was probably in Sicily assisting the other triumvir, Octavian, in completing the conquest of the island from Sextus Pompeius. Replaced by Antony as governor in 35 BC, Sosius returned to Rome and on 3 September 34 BC celebrated a triumph for his victory in Judaea. Thereafter, he seems to have remained in the city, looking after Antony's interests while awaiting his own consulship in 32 BC. Probably to further commemorate his triumph, Sosius also began rebuilding the temple of Apollo in the Campus Martius, adding a cedar statue of Apollo which he plundered from Seleucia in Cilicia back when he was governor.

=== Consulship and civil war ===
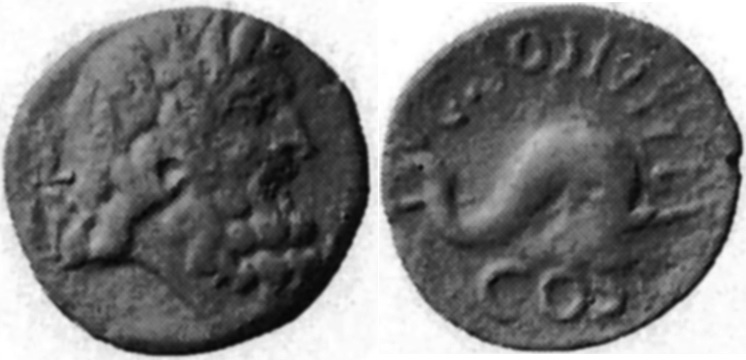
Bronze coin minted under Sosius's authority in Zacynthus, 32 BC. The obverse shows a head of Neptune, and legend COS on the reverse alludes to his consulship that year.

Gaius Sosius assumed the consulship in 32 BC just as the Second Triumvirate, which had ruled Rome for the last decade, was about to legally expire and relations between the triumvirs Antony and Octavian collapsed. Sosius and his colleague in office, Gnaeus Domitius Ahenobarbus, were both partisans of Antony; they brought from him a despatch seeking the official ratification of land grants in the east for his children with the Egyptian queen Cleopatra, the so-called Donations of Alexandria, as well as a proposal for the triumvirs to resign their dictatorial powers. The consuls never published the despatch, however, as they apparently feared that the Donations would be unpopular, and Octavian also pressured them to censor any content unfavorable to himself. Instead, upon entering office, Sosius took the lead with a speech to the Senate in which he praised Antony and openly denounced Octavian. He also introduced a formal motion against the latter, but this was promptly vetoed by a tribune of the plebs. In response, Octavian reconvened the Senate with armed men on the outside, denounced Sosius and Antony, and promised to produce evidence that would incriminate the latter. The consuls and other sympathetic senators fled the city to join Antony and Cleopatra at Ephesus, effectively creating their own makeshift Senate in opposition to the one at Rome. Back in the capital, Sosius, Domitius and Antony were all promptly stripped of office and war was declared on Cleopatra's Egypt.

Sosius was one of Antony's chief lieutenants in the ensuing war, and one of few known senators of consular rank to remain loyal as the Antonian cause grew increasingly precarious. In the summer of 31 BC, Sosius, under cover of fog, routed a squadron of Octavian's fleet led by Lucius Tarius Rufus, but was then driven back by enemy reinforcements under Marcus Agrippa, which cost him the victory and the life of his ally, King Tarcondimotus of Cilicia. He commanded the left wing of Antony's fleet in the defeat at Actium, following which Antony and Cleopatra fled and committed suicide. Sosius survived the defeat and spent time in hiding, but was eventually detected and brought before Octavian, who pardoned him at the intercession of one of his own admirals at Actium, Lucius Arruntius. Historian Ronald Syme, however, has speculated that Sosius might instead have betrayed Antony's fleet and that "his [Sosius'] peril and rescue may have been artfully staged" to advertise Octavian's clemency.

=== Later life ===
Sosius is not known to have undertaken further military service in his life after Actium. He returned to Rome and completed his reconstruction of the temple of Apollo, which became known as Sosianus after him. According to classicist Michael Grant, Sosius accumulated considerable wealth as a successful financier. Octavian, later renamed the emperor Augustus, fully rehabilitated Sosius and gave him a place in the imperial regime, appointing him one of the priestly quindecimviri sacris faciundis who supervised the Saecular Games in 17 BC. Sosius only appears again in history as an attendee to the prosecution of a teacher of rhetoric named Corvus, an event dated by Frederick Cramer to AD 6.

Gaius Sosius is not known to have had sons, but at least one daughter is attested, Sosia, who married Sextus Nonius Quinctilianus, consul in AD 8. Possibly a second daughter was Sosia Galla, wife of the consul Gaius Silius.

== Citations ==
Political offices
Preceded by L. Vinicius; Q. Laronius as suffecti	Roman consul 32 BC; With: Cn. Domitius Ahenobarbus	Succeeded by L. Cornelius; M. Valerius Messalla as suffecti
