= Spes =

Goddess in ancient Roman religion

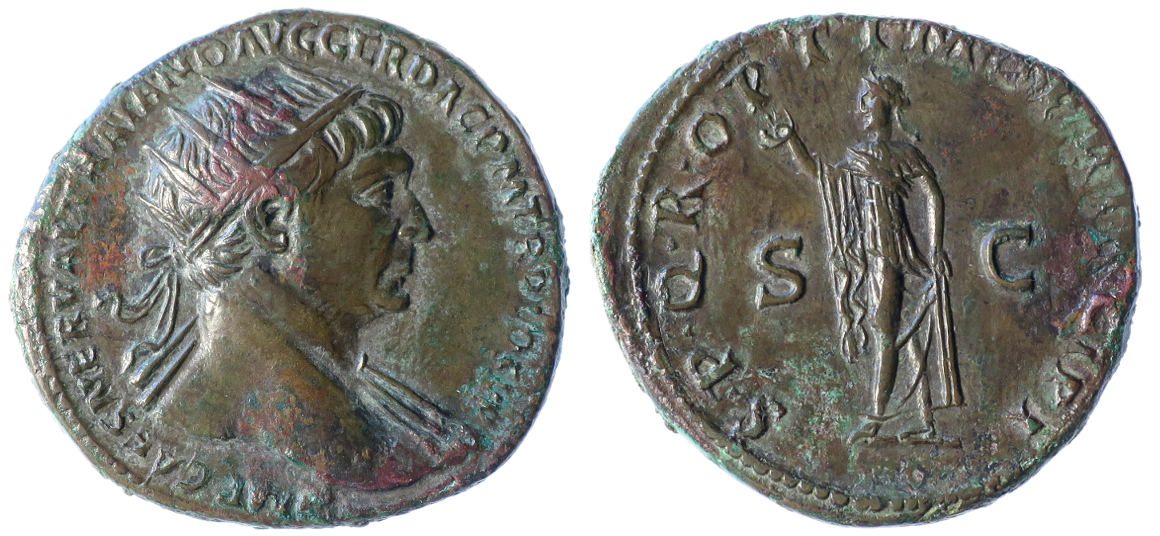
An ancient Roman coin with Spes on the reverse.

Spes (Latin for "Hope") was worshipped as a goddess or personification of hope in ancient Roman religion. Numerous temples to Spes are known, and inscriptions indicate that she received private devotion as well as state cult.

== Republican Hope ==
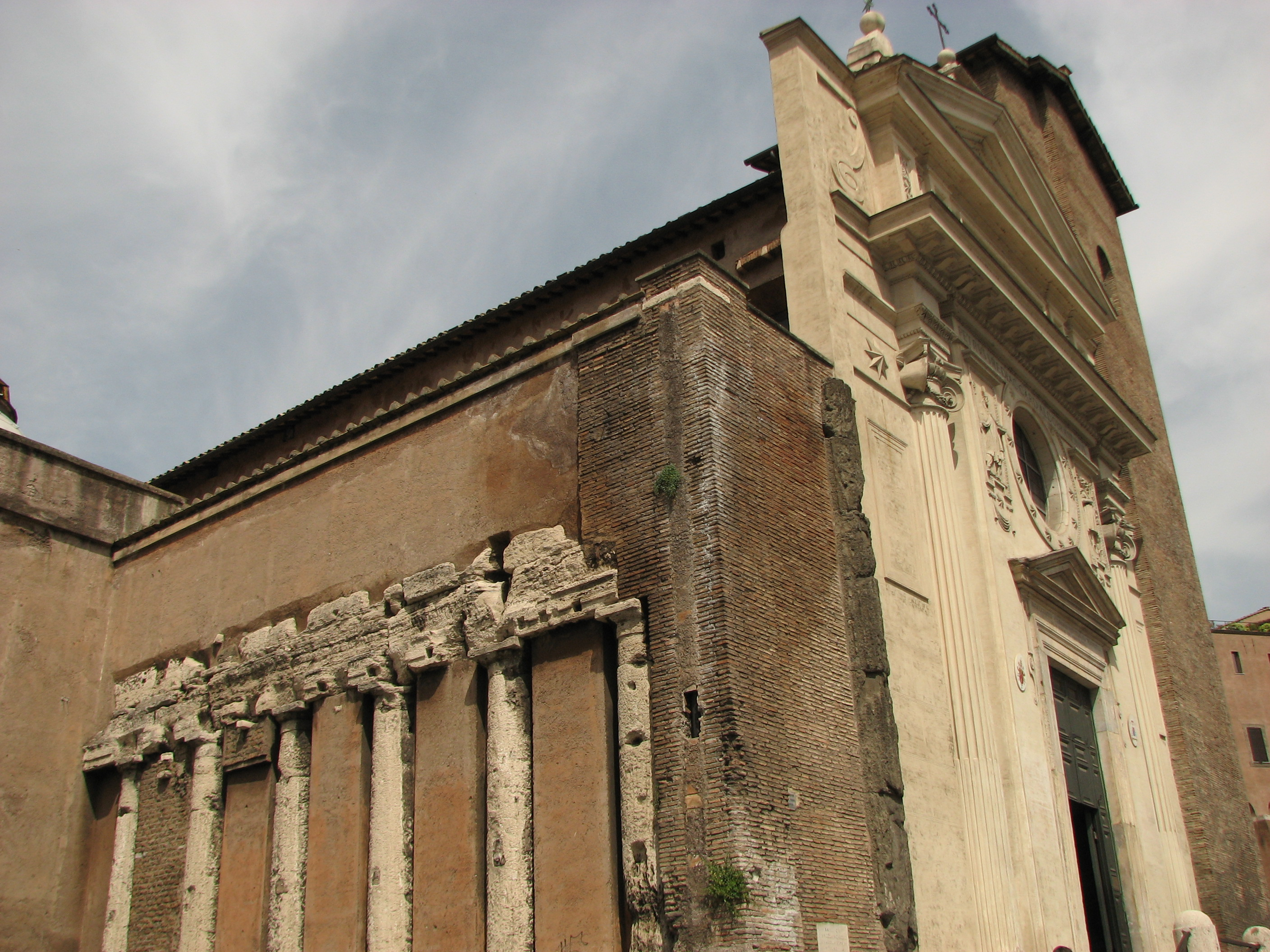
Columns from the Temple of Spes at the Forum Olitorium were incorporated into the San Nicola in Carcere church

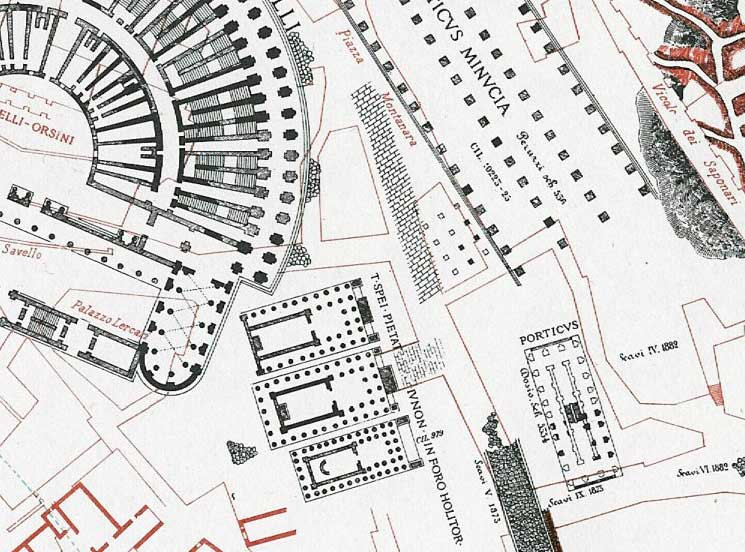
The Temple of Spes with those of Piety and Juno Sospita at the Forum Olitorium, drawn by Lanciani

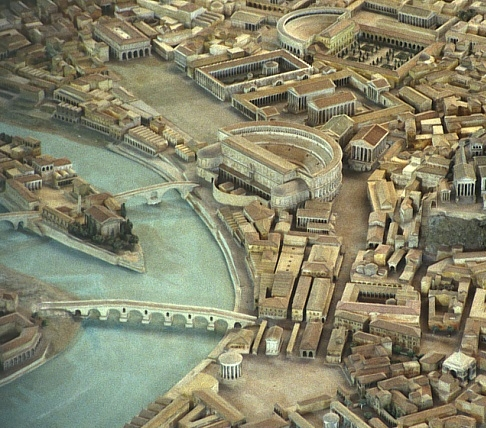
The area of the Forum Olitorium and Theater of Marcellus in the scale model of ancient Rome at the Museum of Roman Civilization

During the Republic, a temple to "ancient Hope" (Spes vetus) was supposed to have been located near the Praenestine Gate. It was associated with events that occurred in the 5th century BC, but its existence as anything except perhaps a private shrine has been doubted.

A well-documented Temple of Spes was built by Aulus Atilius Calatinus along with Fides, as the result of vows (vota) made to these goddesses during the First Punic War. This was built at the vegetable market (Forum Olitorium) just outside the Carmental Gate. It was twice burnt down and restored, first in 213 BC and then again in AD 7.

At Capua in 110 BC, a temple was built to the triad of Spes, Fides, and Fortuna.

== Imperial Hope ==
Spes was one of the divine personifications in the Imperial cult of the Virtues. Spes Augusta was Hope associated with the capacity of the emperor as Augustus to ensure blessed conditions.

Like Salus ("Salvation, Security"), Ops ("Abundance, Prosperity"), and Victoria ("Victory"), Spes was a power that had to come from the gods, in contrast to divine powers that resided within the individual such as Mens ("Intelligence"), Virtus ("Virtue"), and Fides ("Faith, Fidelity, Trustworthiness").

== Greek Elpis ==
The Greek counterpart of Spes was Elpis, who by contrast had no formal cult in Greece. The primary myth in which Elpis plays a role is the story of Pandora. The Greeks had ambivalent or even negative feelings about "hope", with Euripides describing it in his Suppliants as "delusive" and stating "it has embroiled many a State", and the concept was unimportant in the philosophical systems of the Stoics and Epicureans. Except with regard to the core value of Stoicism which is to control things within your power, hope is outside the power of the present.

== See also ==
- Hope, the concept
- Piety (Pietas), Luck (Fortuna), Faithfulness (Fides) as Roman goddesses
