= Giuseppe Gatteschi =

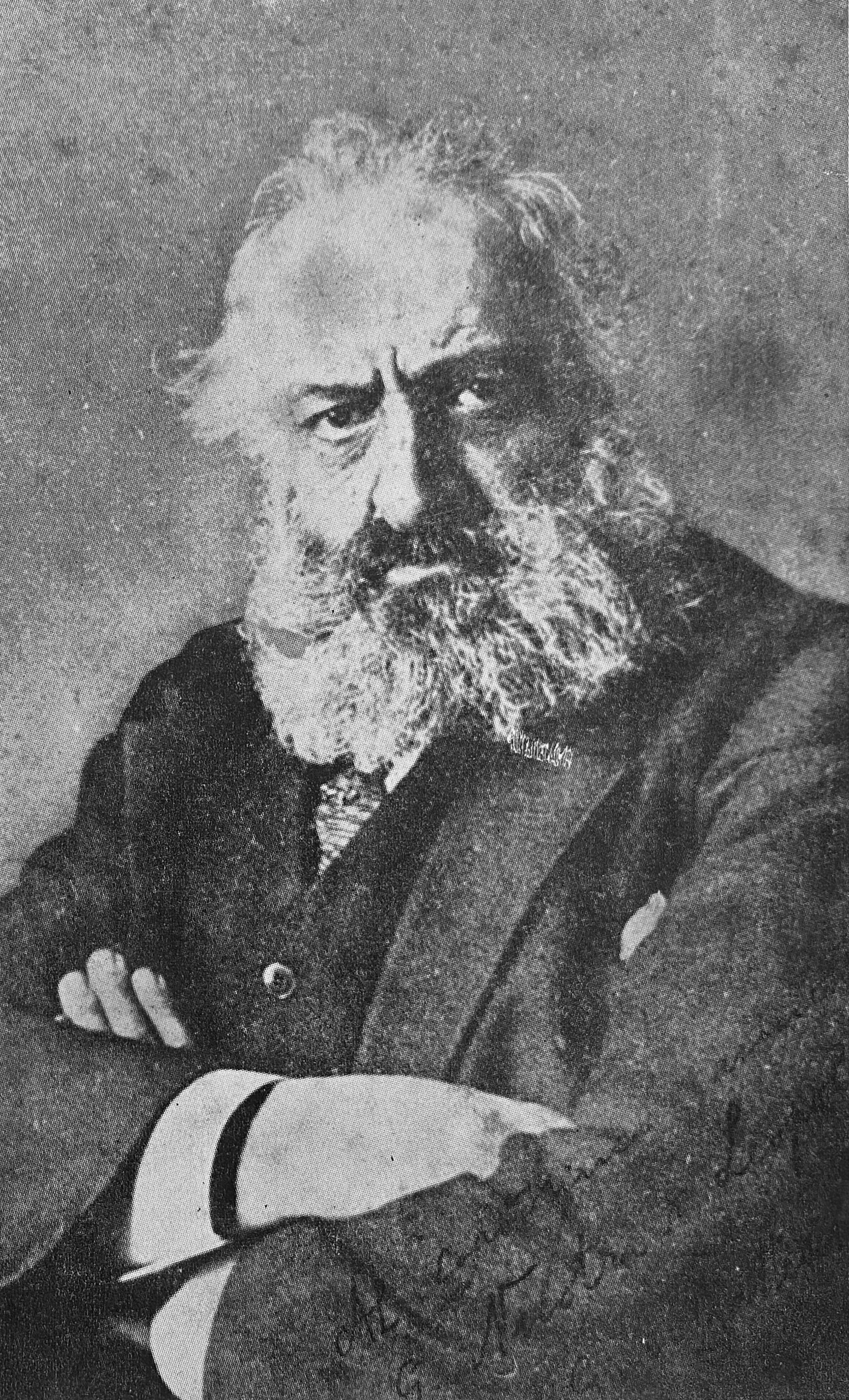
- Born: c. 1866
- Died: 1935
- Occupation: draftsman

Giuseppe Gatteschi (c. 1866 – 1935) was an Italian draftsman, known for his meticulous reconstructions of the urban landscape of ancient Rome. From the 1890s until his death in 1935, he made this work his vocation and his obsession. His method of reconstruction was based on his own photographic documentation of the contemporary landscape, combined with a careful reading of ancient and medieval descriptions, as well as the archaeological publications of his contemporaries. His authority rests essentially on the graphic synthesis of these various elements, rather than on scientific expertise.

Gatteschi was born in Alexandria, on Sept. 29, 1866. He was contemporary with the architect Paul Bigot, who produced watercolors and later a 3D model of the Plan of Rome. Like Bigot, Gatteschi chose to reconstruct the city at the time of the height of imperial power, that is, during the reign of Emperor Constantine.

Gatteschi's work was published during his lifetime in the form of prints and book illustrations, and compiled in his masterpiece, Restauri della Roma imperiale : con gli stati attuali ed il testo spiegativo in quattro lingue (Rome, 1924). On the prints, Gatteschi is designated “archaeologist” rather than “artist,” the latter designation being applied to other artists such as Guido Trabacchi (1862–1938). Gatteschi's archives, including his photographs and original illustrations, are held at the American Academy in Rome.

Gatteschi died at Rome on March 20, 1935.

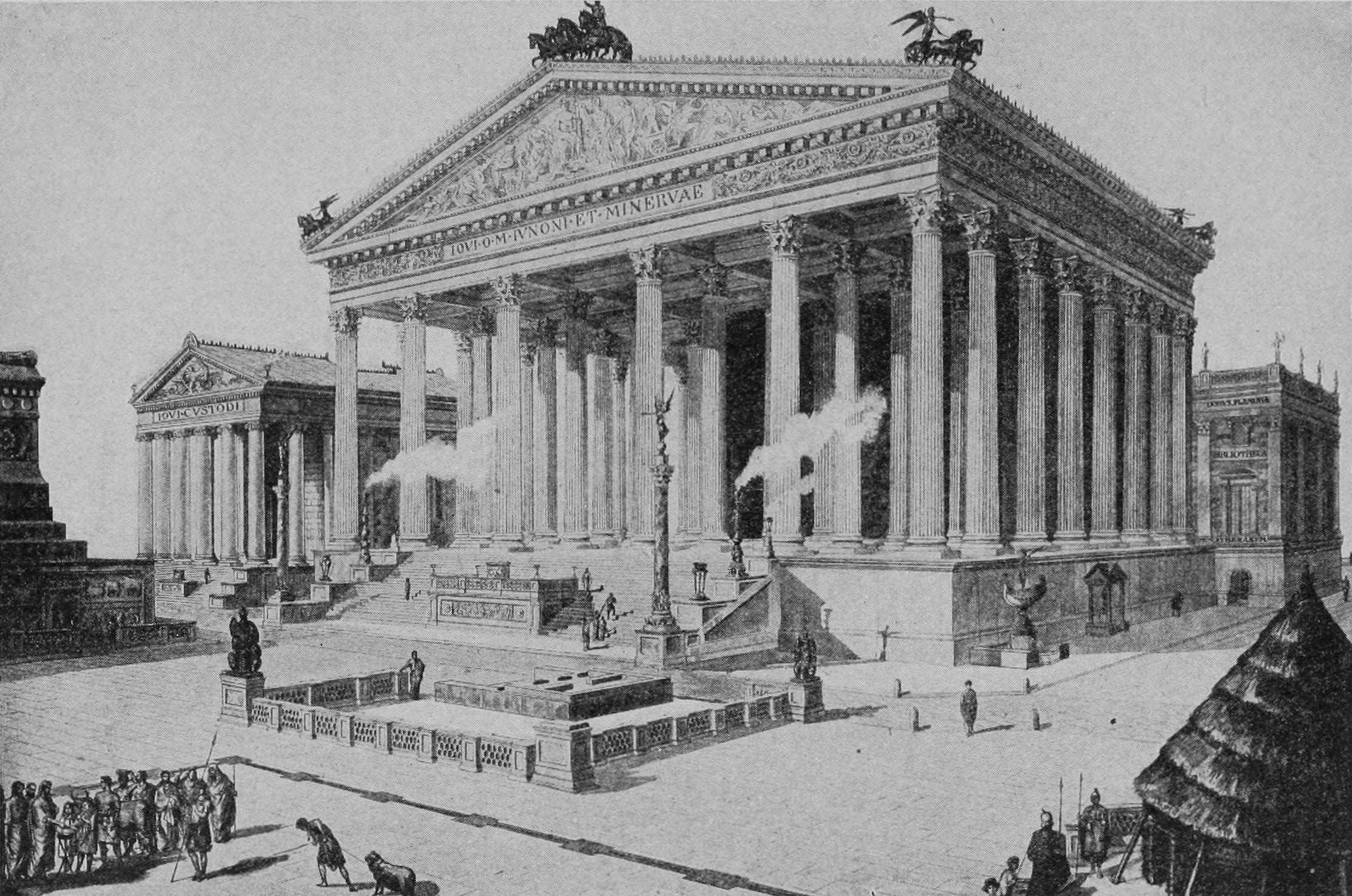
Reconstruction by Gatteschi of the Temple of Jupiter Optimus Maximus in ancient Rome (published 1909). American Academy in Rome, Gatteschi collection.

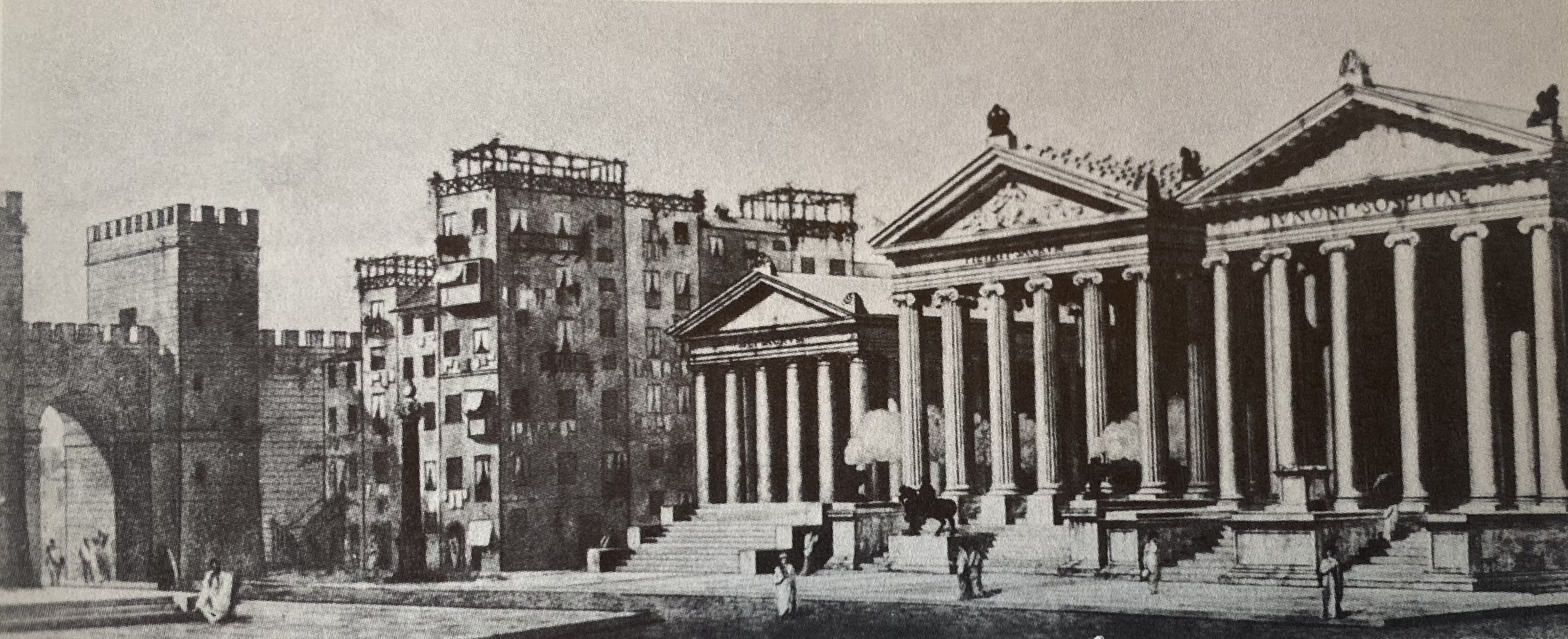
Reconstruction by Gatteschi of the Forum Holitorium in ancient Rome (published 1918). Shown are the Servian Wall, a set of apartment buildings, and the temples of Janus, Spes and Juno (L-R).

== Works ==
- Restauri della Roma imperiale : con gli stati attuali ed il testo spiegativo in quattro lingue, Rome:Max Bretschneider, 1924.
- La Roma dei Cesari. The Imperial Rome (Simonetta Magaldi and Sergio Lambiase, eds.), Naples: Intra Moenia, 2009. (Anastatic reprint of the 1924 work, with a biographical note on Gatteschi and critical texts.)
