= Manius Acilius Glabrio =

Manius Acilius Glabrio may refer to:

- Manius Acilius Glabrio (consul 191 BC), Roman senator
- Manius Acilius Glabrio (consul 154 BC), Roman senator
- Manius Acilius Glabrio (consul 67 BC), Roman senator
- Manius Acilius Glabrio (consul 91), Roman senator executed by the emperor Domitian
- Manius Acilius Glabrio Gnaeus Cornelius Severus (c.119 – after 177), Roman senator, consul in 152
- Manius Acilius Glabrio (consul 186), Roman senator
