= Marcus Valerius Messalla (consul 32 BC) =

Roman senator

Marcus Valerius Messalla (born c. 80 BC) was a Roman senator who was appointed suffect consul in 32 BC.

== Biography ==
Valerius Messalla, a member of the patrician gens Valeria, was the son of Marcus Valerius Messalla Rufus, who was consul in 53 BC. In that year, he was appointed a triumvir monetalis.

Taking no part in the civil war and the political upheavals of the Second Triumvirate, in 32 BC he was appointed suffect consul after both consuls left Rome to join Marc Antony in Ephesus, following Caesar Octavian's attack on Gaius Sosius and Marcus Antonius. Nothing further is known of his career after leaving the consulship.

Valerius Messalla apparently had no sons of his own. He therefore probably adopted Marcus Valerius Messalla Appianus, who was probably the son of Appius Claudius Pulcher, the consul of 38 BC. He may have been the Marcus Valerius who was the patron of the town of Mallus.

== Sources ==
- Broughton, T. Robert S. (1952). The Magistrates of the Roman Republic, 99 B.C.-31 B.C. Vol. 2. New York: American Philological Association. OCLC 1120836609.
- Syme, Ronald (1986). The Augustan Aristocracy. Clarendon Press. ISBN 978-0-19-814859-3.

Political offices
Preceded by Gaius Sosius	Roman consul 32 BC (suffect) with Lucius Cornelius	Succeeded by Octavian III; Marcus Valerius Messalla Corvinus
