= Temple of Janus (Roman Forum) =

Roman temple from classical period

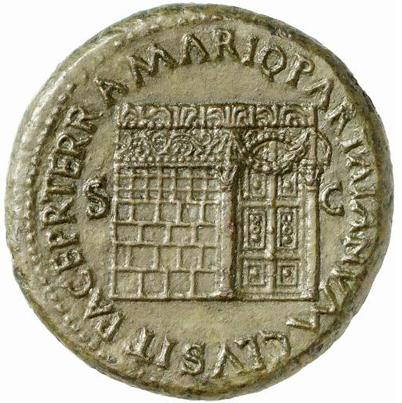
- Temple of Janus on a coin from the reign of Nero (54–68 AD), with ornate roof decoration, a latticed window (left), and a garland hung across the closed double doors (right)

- Shown in ancient Rome
- Interactive map of Temple of Janus
- 41°53′34.73″N 12°29′8.60″E

The Temple of Janus stood in the Roman Forum near the Basilica Aemilia, along the Argiletum. It was a small temple with a statue of Janus, the two-faced god of boundaries and beginnings inside. Its doors were known as the "Gates of Janus", which were closed in times of peace and opened in times of war. There are many theories about its original purpose; some say that it was a bridge over the Velabrum, and some say it functioned as a gate to the Capitoline.

== Origins ==
According to Livy 1.19 the second king of Rome, Numa Pompilius, decided to distract the early, warlike Romans from their violent ways by instilling in them awe and reverence. His projects included promoting religion, certain priesthoods, and the building of temples as a distraction with the beneficial effect of imbuing spirituality. The Janus in the Roman Forum, although not a temple was claimed to be Numa's most famous architectural project.

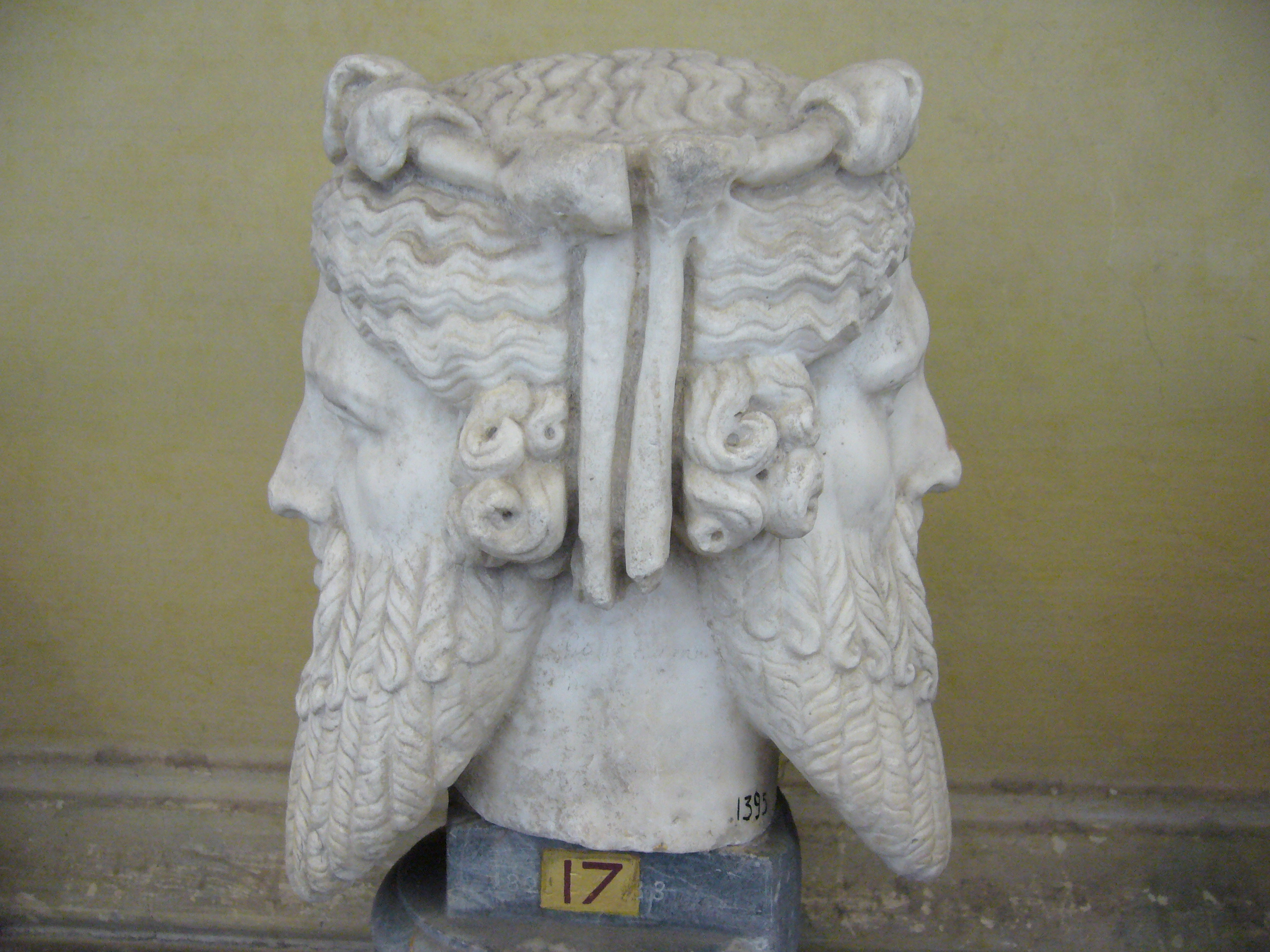
Statue representing Janus Bifrons in the Vatican Museums

In the early stages of the city of Rome, the inhabitants lived in separate walled villas. The Janus was the gate from the Forum to the rest of Rome as originally the Forum was the courtyard of the king's villa.

== Ancient descriptions ==
Plutarch, in Life of King Numa, wrote:

[Janus] also has a temple at Rome with double doors, which they call the gates of war; for it always stands open in time of war, but is closed when peace has come. The latter was a difficult matter, and it rarely happened, since the realm was always engaged in some war, as its increasing size brought it into collision with the barbarous nations which encompassed it round about. But in the time of Augustus it was closed, after he had overthrown Mark Antony; and before that, when Marcus Atilius and Titus Manlius were consuls, it was closed for a short time; then war broke out again at once, and it was opened.

== Appearance and construction ==
The Temple of Janus was a small temple just large enough to house a bronze statue of the god. A small portion of the temple's brick structure can be found beside the ruins of the Basilica Aemilia, along the path of the Argiletum in the Roman Forum, so much of what we know about the temple visually comes from Roman scholars and artifacts. The various styles of architecture seen on Roman coins suggest rough dates for the reconstructions; both in the third and fourth centuries BC. As described by the Byzantine scholar Procopius who says "the temple is entirely of bronze and was erected in the form of a square, but it is only large enough to cover the statue of Janus ... of bronze and not less than five cubits high". There are also descriptions that can be taken from items from the Roman world most notably coins minted for Emperor Nero. These coins depict the Temple of Janus as a small rectangular building with two doors accompanied by two columns having Ashlar masonry on the outside and only bronze plating on the inside. This shows a discrepancy in the sources, leaving the assumption that it was bronze only on the inside of the Temple. The temple of Athena Chalcioecus in Sparta and Apollo at Delphi are also built this way. The art style of the Temple was inspired by Etruscan architecture and influences from the Near East.

== Purpose of the gates ==
The Gates themselves were the main purpose for the Temple of Janus. The opening and closing of the gates were to symbolize either wartime or peace. The Temple of Janus tied in warfare and religious tradition. It is unanimously held by ancient and modern scholars that the gates were closed in peace and opened in times of war. While its purpose is agreed upon the reasons behind the openings and closings of the gates are much murkier. Both Virgil and Ennius state that the gates held in Discord and Fury inside the temple during times of peace. Ennius's Annales state "After foul Discord has broken open the iron-clad posts and gates of war". Virgil supports this view with "There are twin gates of War ... Janus the guard does not withdraw from his threshold". Horace does not use prison imagery but can be interpreted as saying peace, or if Janus himself, is kept locked in the temple. This lack of clarity by the Romans themselves demonstrates the fluctuating nature of their mythos-history. However, a Roman viewed the Temple of Janus's gates as having them shut was a time of celebration and of pride for the rulers of Rome. As demonstrated by Caesar Augustus's accounts of shutting the doors three times.

== The gates in use ==
During Numa's reign, the Gates of Janus were closed as Rome was at peace. The next king, Tullus Hostilius, opened the Gates of Janus when he went to war with Alba Longa. The Gates of Janus remained open for the next 400 years until after the First Punic War when A. Manlius Torquatus closed the Gates of Janus in 241 BC. War with the Gauls in Northern Italy forced the Gates of Janus to reopen. They did not close again until 29 BC, following the deaths of Antony and Cleopatra.

The Res Gestae Divi Augusti, a first-person account of the life of Augustus, claims:

The Janus Quirinus, which our ancestors wished to be closed whenever peace had been secured by victories throughout the Roman Empire by land and sea, was recorded to have been closed, before I was born, twice altogether since the foundation of the city, but the senate decreed that it should be closed on three occasions while I was princeps.

From Cassius Dio 51.20 and 53.27 we are able to date the first two closures in Augustus's reign to 29 and 25 BC respectively. The exact date of the third closure remains a matter of scholarly debate. The only ancient author to date it was Orosius, who associates the event with the birth of Christ, traditionally (but probably incorrectly) assigned to December 1 BC. However, modern scholars almost universally reject Orosius because Roman armies were campaigning in Germany and/or the Far East at this time. Inez Scott Ryberg and Gaius Stern date the third closure more plausibly to 13 BC based on the joint return of Augustus and Agrippa to Rome after pacifying the provinces. Sir Ronald Syme dated the closure to 7 BC, to coincide with the triumph of Tiberius and his second consulship, the events of which year are lost in a gap in the surviving manuscripts of Cassius Dio. Mario Torelli followed Orosius' date.

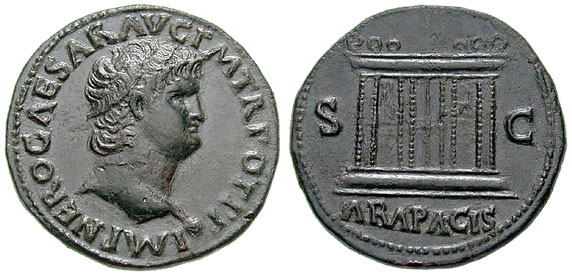
Coin of emperor Nero: Obverse: Nero; Reverse: Ara Pacis

Later emperors also closed the Gates of the Janus to great fanfare. The most famous closures occurred under Nero and Vespasian. Nero minted a large series of coins with the Ara Pacis (and the Janus itself with closed gates) on the reverse to commemorate this event. Other emperors certainly closed and reopened the Gates of the Janus, but references in later and less thorough historians are fairly rare. There is a record of Gordian III in about the year 241 opening the doors for his war with Shapur I .

The Roman poet Virgil included in the Aeneid the opening of the Gates of Janus to start war between the Trojans and the Latins.

== Later historical contexts ==
The legends of Janus have been used for many purposes throughout history. 16th century Roman priests used them to justify the seat of Christianity being moved from Rome to Jerusalem and described the Vatican as the "Throne of Janus". This was done to gain traction in Italy through the perceived support of the "god of beginnings".

The story of the Gates of Janus was also used by British political and military leaders during the 19th and early 20th centuries. They portrayed the opening of the Gates as a part of the glory of war and used the legend to add honour to the wars over control of their empire.

== See also ==
- List of Ancient Roman temples
- Pax Romana
- Temple of Janus (Forum Holitorium)
- Numa Pompilius
