= Forum Holitorium =

Ancient Roman forum in Rome

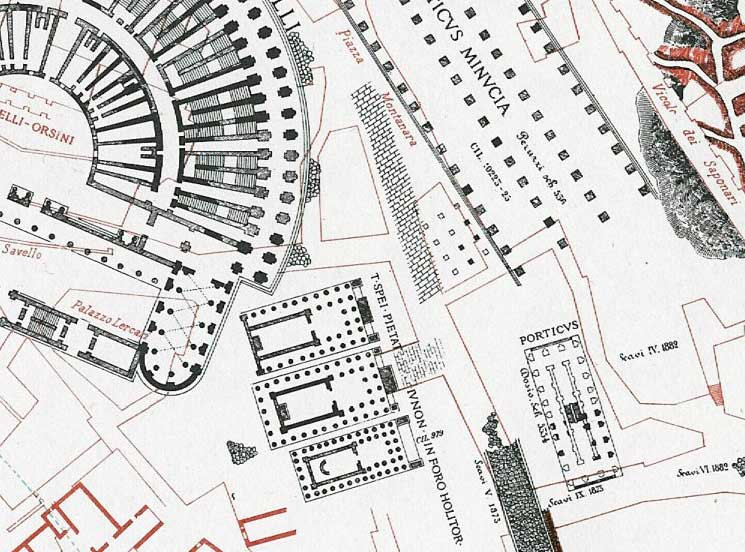
- A map of the Forum Holitorium, with the outline of the Theatre of Marcellus at the top left, drawn by Rodolfo Lanciani between 1893 and 1901 on the basis of the Forma Urbis Romae.

- Shown within Augustan Rome
- Interactive map of Forum Holitorium
- 41°53′28″N 12°28′48″E
- Periods: 5th century BC
- Cultures: Ancient Rome
- Location: Rome, Italy

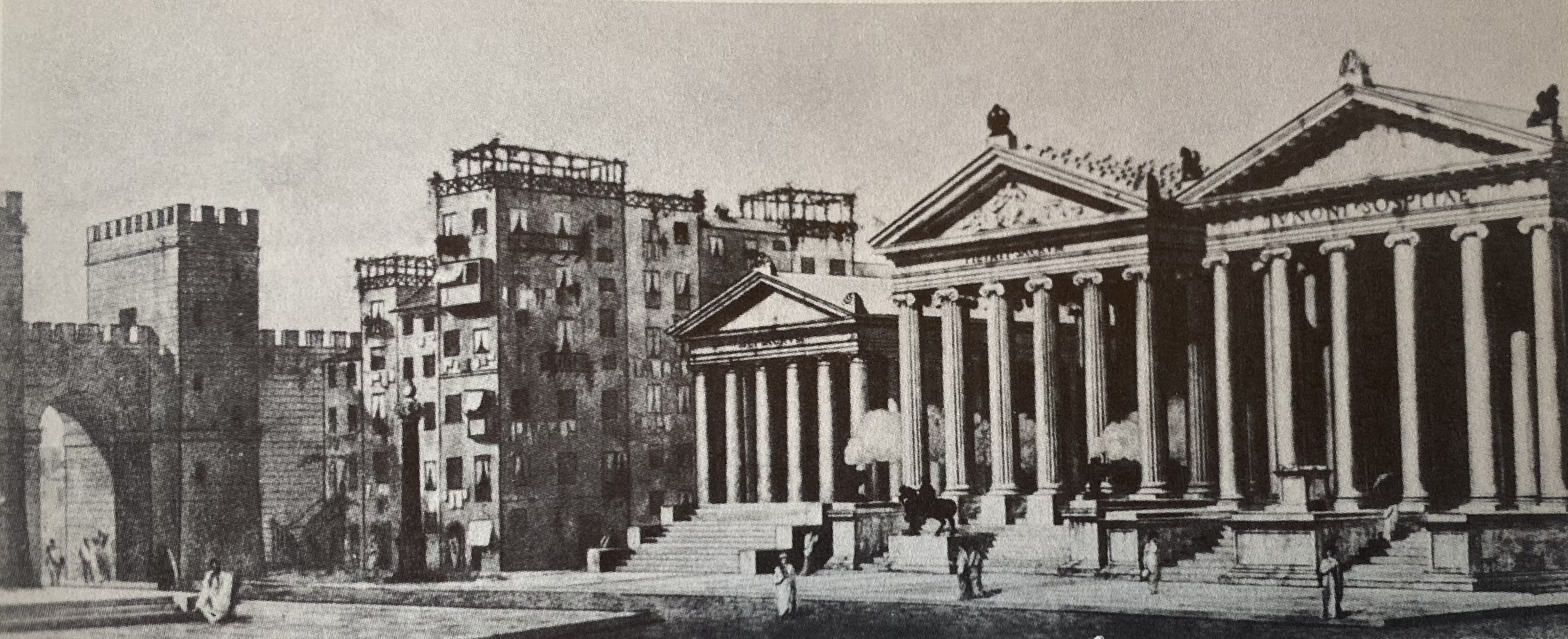
Imaginative reconstruction of the Forum Holitorium circa 300 AD, by Giuseppe Gatteschi, 1918. Shown are the Servian Wall, a set of apartment buildings, and the temples of Janus, Spes and Juno (L-R).

The Forum Holitorium or Olitorium (Latin for the "Market of the Vegetable Sellers"; Italian: Foro Olitorio) is an archaeological area of Rome, Italy, on the slopes of the Capitoline Hill. It was located outside the Carmental Gate in the Campus Martius, crowded between the cattle market (Forum Boarium) and buildings located in the Circus Flaminius.

In ancient times, it was the fruit and vegetable market, while the area of the adjacent Forum Boarium served as a meat market. At its northern end were the temples of Bellona, goddess of war, and Apollo Medicus. It also included a sacred area with three small temples dedicated to Janus, Spes, and Juno Sospita.

== The sacred area ==
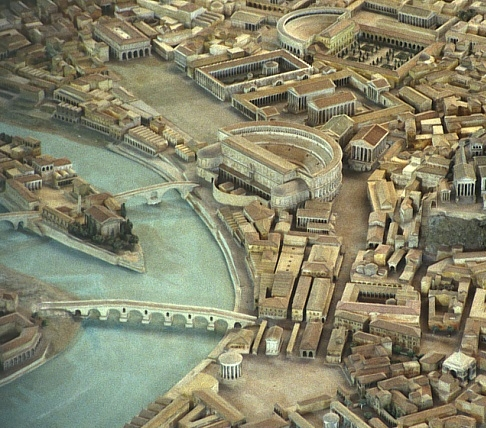
A detail of Gismondi's scale model of ancient Rome at the Museum of Roman Civilization showing the area of the Theatre of Marcellus, the Forum Holitorium and the Forum Boarium.

The construction of the sacred area of the forum dates back to the Republican age, more precisely to the period between the first and the Second Punic War. Subsequently, at the time of Caesar (1st century BC), it underwent renovations which involved the demolition of a fourth temple: it was built by Manius Acilius Glabrio (consul in 191 BC) next to the Temple of Janus and was demolished during the construction of the Theatre of Marcellus (then completed by Augustus). The temple was dedicated to the worship of Diana.

The staircases of the three temples were not aligned, which confirms the absence of uniform town-planning criteria during the Republican age. Their construction limited the area of the market, which previously might have extended up to the Tiber.

These temples are now part of the structure of the Basilica of San Nicola in Carcere, first attested in the 11th century Liber Pontificalis.

=== Temple of Janus ===
The Temple of Janus was the one located on the right and the closest to the Theatre of Marcellus. Built by Gaius Duilius at the time of the First Punic War, it was restored in AD 17 by Tiberius.

It was a peripteros temple sine postìcum (with columns on three sides), with eight tuff (peperino) columns on the long sides and six on the front (hexastyle), covered with stucco and raised on a low podium with elegant shaping.

=== Temple of Spes ===
The Temple of Spes (Latin: Aedes Spei) was located on the left, in opposition to the Temple of Janus. It was built by Aulus Atilius Calatinus, at the time of the First Punic War as well; it was restored in 232 BC and rebuilt after the fire of 213 BC, which also destroyed the temples of Sant'Omobono Area; finally it was restored in AD 17 by Germanicus Julius Caesar.

It was a peripteros doric temple with six columns on the front and eleven on the long side; the columns were made of raw travertine and covered with stucco to simulate the appearance of marble. It measured 25 metres (82 ft) in length and 11 metres (36 ft) in width.

Six columns of the temple with their architrave still exist, incorporated in the left side of the church of San Nicola.

=== Temple of Juno Sospita ===
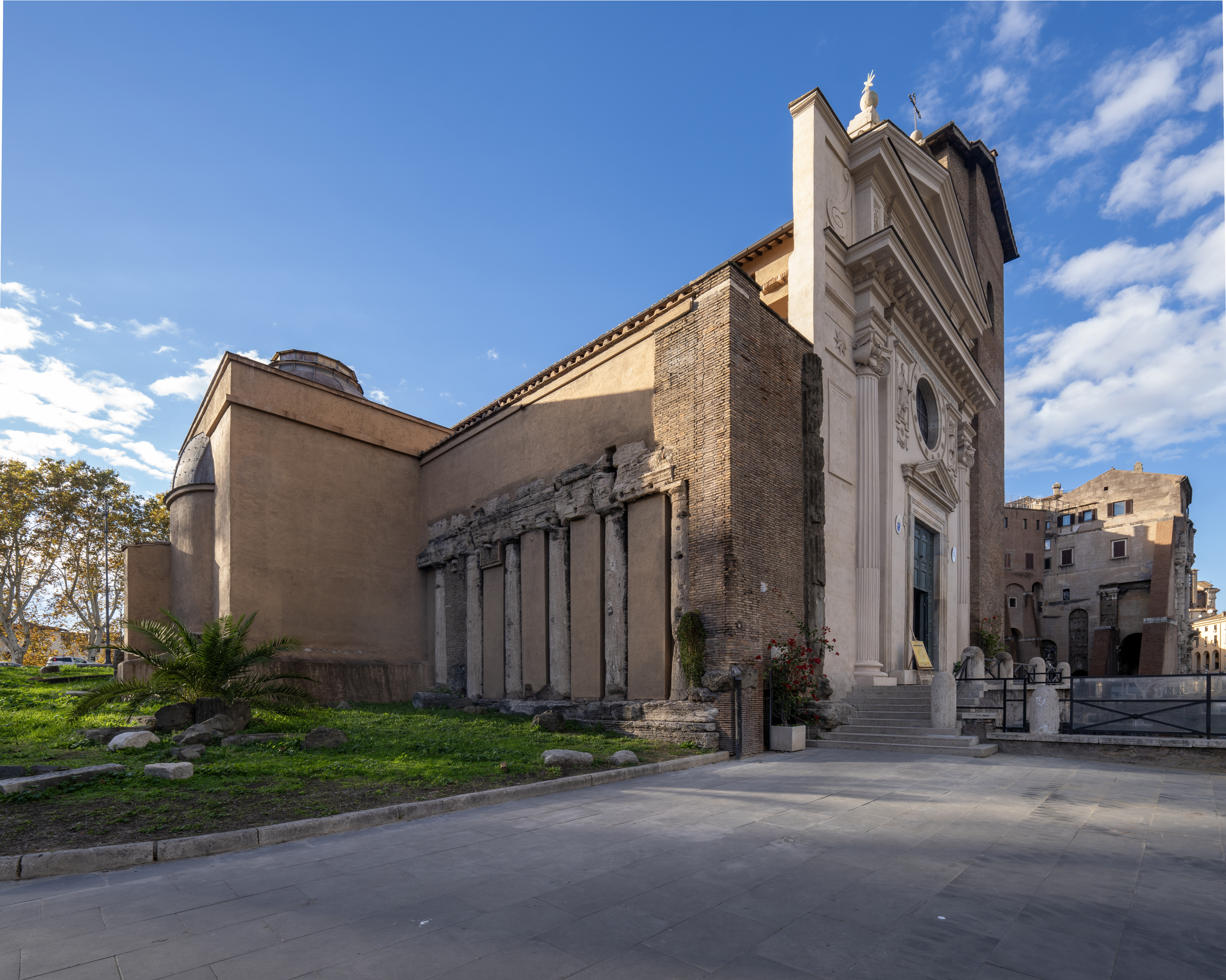
The church of San Nicola in Carcere. Six columns of the temple of Spes are incorporated in the southern side, while three columns of the temple of Juno Sospita are incorporated in the façade.

The temple of Juno Sospita was located between the temple of Spes and that of Janus: on its ruins, towards the end of the 11th century, the current church was founded.

Built around 195 BC by Gaius Cornelius Cethegus, it was a peripteros ionic temple, with six columns on the facade, three rows of columns on the front side and two on the back side. A travertine staircase, the same which is still used today to access the church, led to the pronaos of the temple. It was the largest of the three, since it measured 30 metres (98 ft) in length and 15 metres (49 ft) in width, as well as the tallest one, as can be seen by comparing the preserved columns of each of the temples. The present structure is due to the restoration commissioned by a certain Caecilia Metella in 90 BC.

The remains of the temple are the basement, which can be visited inside the church, and three columns incorporated into the facade, one of which has no capital; these columns were still visible in their original state before the facade was rebuilt. Other remains, such as some columns, are visible inside the church.

== See also ==
- Forum Venalium
- Forum Boarium
- Forum Piscarium
- Velabrum

Preceded by Forum Boarium	Landmarks of Rome; Forum Holitorium	Succeeded by Basilica Argentaria
