= Manius Acilius Glabrio (consul 154 BC) =

Roman politician in the second century BC

Manius Acilius Glabrio was a Roman politician in the second century BC.

== Family ==
He was a member of gens Acilia. His father was Manius Acilius Glabrio, consul in 191 BC.

== Career ==
In 181 BC, Acilius Glabrio completed the building of the Temple of Piety and dedicated it. In the temple he erected a statue of his father, the first in Rome made of gold. In 166 BC, he served as aedile. In 165 BC, he helped to organize the Megalesian games. In 154 BC, Acilius Glabrio was appointed suffect consul upon the premature death of Lucius Postumius Albinus.
