= Italo Gismondi =

Italian archaeologist (1887–1974)

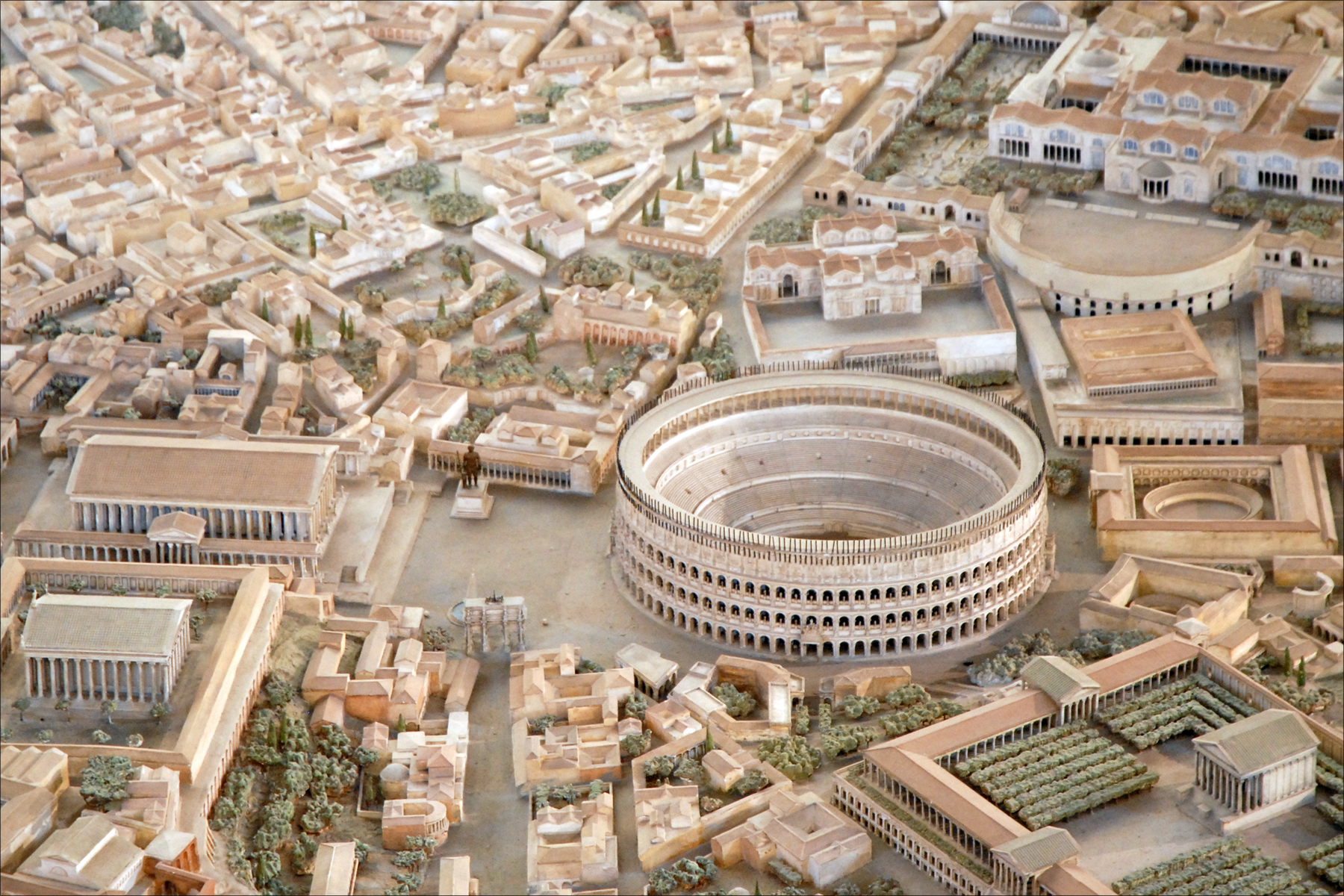
Gismondi's model of Rome in the time of Constantine

Italo Gismondi (August 12, 1887 in Rome, Italy – December 2, 1974 in Rome) was an Italian archaeologist. He is most famed for Il Plastico, a massive scale model of imperial Rome under Constantine the Great.

Gismondi was a practicing architect who did not publish many articles but created numerous drawings of ancient Roman buildings and infrastructure.

== Life ==
Gismondi entered the Amministrazione delle Antichità e Belle Arti in 1910 and was named Director of the Ostia excavations where he remained for 44 years. From 1919 to 1938 he also served as the superintendent of antiquities for the city of Rome.

Ostia was the primary focus of Gismondi's work and he made fundamental contributions to its study. Gismondi was particularly interested in architectonic aspects of ancient building.

A trained architect, he carried out numerous projects, including a plan of the Imperial forums in Rome in 1933; the restoration of the northwest portion of the Baths of Diocletian (1927) and also work on the Planetarium of the same complex. Between 1935 and 1971, Gismondi worked to execute the famed model of imperial Rome (Italian: Il Plastico di Roma Imperiale) at the Museum of Roman Civilization in Rome's EUR area. The model is generally built on a scale of 1:250 but somewhat enlarges the more important buildings to allow greater detail work. Commissioned by Benito Mussolini in 1933 in honor of the 2000th anniversary of Augustus's birth, it is principally based on Lanciani's edition of the 3rd-century Severan Forma Urbis Romae but incorporates other archaeological work and extends it to represent the city under Constantine the Great in the early 4th century.

Elsewhere in Italy Gismondi worked with the Soprintendenza alle Antichità degli Abruzzi and Molise, in Abruzzo and Molise, for the Soprintendenza of Umbria and for the Soprintendenza for excavation in Eastern Sicily. He also carried out archaeological work in Libya, Cyrene and Tripolitania.

After his death, his work was donated to the Archaeological Superintendency of Latium–Ostia Office and the City of Rome. It remained private until a 2007 exhibition of Gismondi's work at Palazzo Altemps in Rome revived interest for the author's work.

== Honors ==
- 1974: Premio Cultori di Roma
