= Origin of the Milky Way =

Origin of the Milky Way may refer to:

- Formation of galaxies
- The Origin of the Milky Way (Tintoretto)
- The Origin of the Milky Way (Rubens)
