= Perseus Freeing Andromeda (disambiguation) =

Perseus Freeing Andromeda is the title of several paintings, including:

- Perseus Freeing Andromeda (Piero di Cosimo)
- Perseus Freeing Andromeda (Rubens)
- Perseus Freeing Andromeda (Wtewael)
