= The Birth of the Milky Way =

Painting by Peter Paul Rubens circa 1637

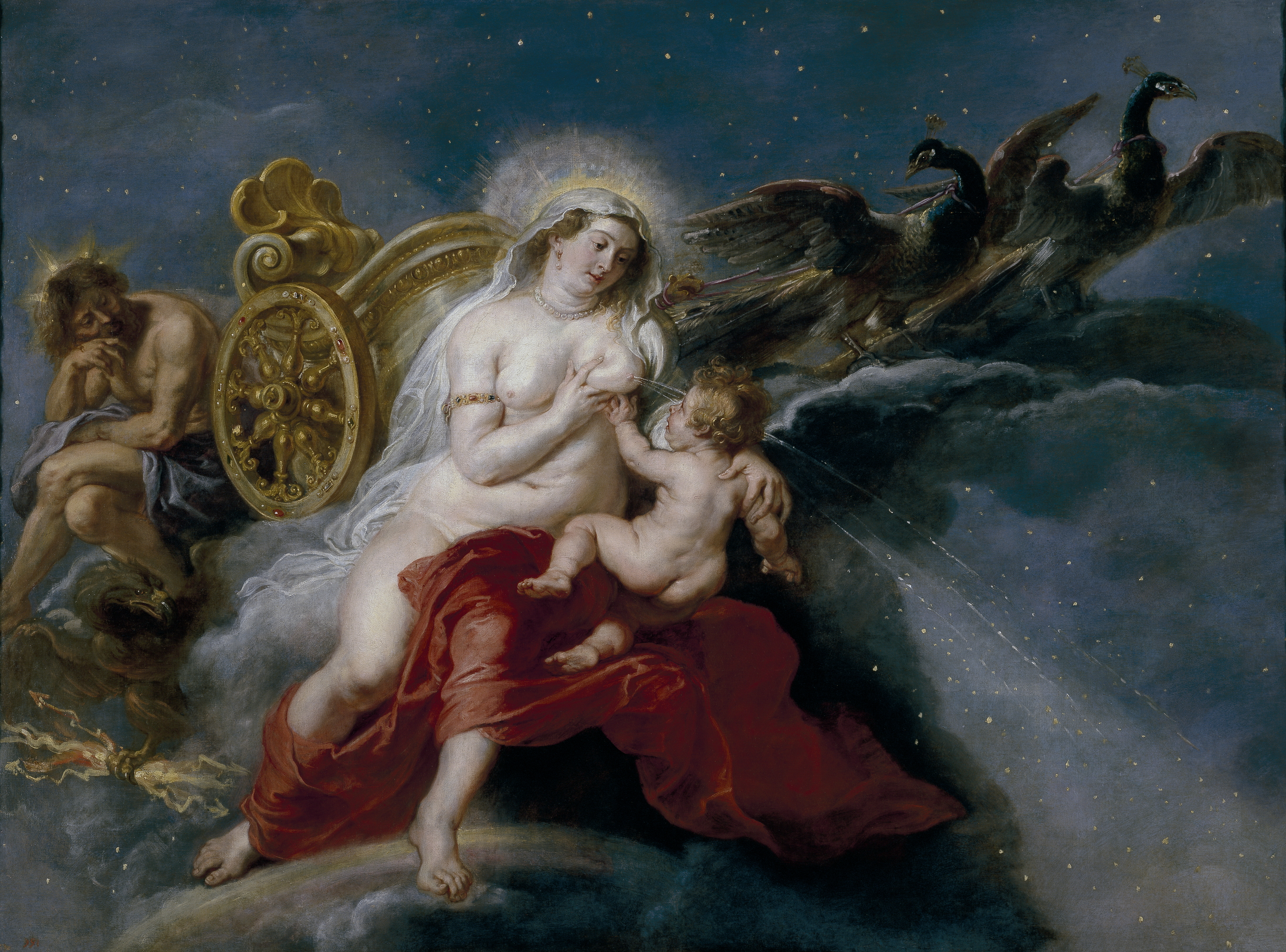
- Artist: Peter Paul Rubens
- Year: c. 1637
- Medium: Oil on canvas
- Dimensions: 181 cm × 244 cm (71 in × 96 in)
- Location: Museo del Prado; Madrid

The Birth of the Milky Way, also sometimes known as The Origin of the Milky Way, is an oil-on-canvas painting by the Flemish artist Peter Paul Rubens, produced between 1636 and 1638 and featuring the Greco-Roman myth of the origin of the Milky Way. The painting depicts Hera (Juno), spilling her breast milk, the infant Heracles (Hercules) and Zeus (Jupiter) in the background, identifiable by his eagle and lightning bolts. Hera's face is modelled on Rubens' wife, Hélène Fourment. The carriage is pulled by peacocks, a bird which the ancient Greeks and Romans considered sacred to both themselves and to Hera/Juno, as a result of their ability to signal changes in weather through cries and hence their perceived connection to the gods.

With a width of 244 cm (96 in) and height of 181 cm (71 in), the image was a part of the commission from Philip IV of Spain for Rubens, along with other painters such as Diego Velázquez, to decorate Torre de la Parada, the monarch's recreational house and hunting lodge located on Monte de El Pardo. The commission consisted of 112 paintings based on Ovid's Metamorphoses, including this painting. The latter is now held in room 79 at the Museo del Prado, in Madrid, with inventory number P01668.

== Theme ==
According to Diodorus Siculus, Hercules' mother, Alcmene, fearing Hera's jealousy, abandoned her newborn baby in the fields. However, when Hera passed by, Athena, who was accompanying her, discovered the baby and, amazed by his talent, asked her to breastfeed him. Hera agreed, but when Hercules grabbed her breast with incredible strength, Hera pushed the baby away. Yet, seeing the child suckle, Athena took him to Alcmene and urged her to raise him.

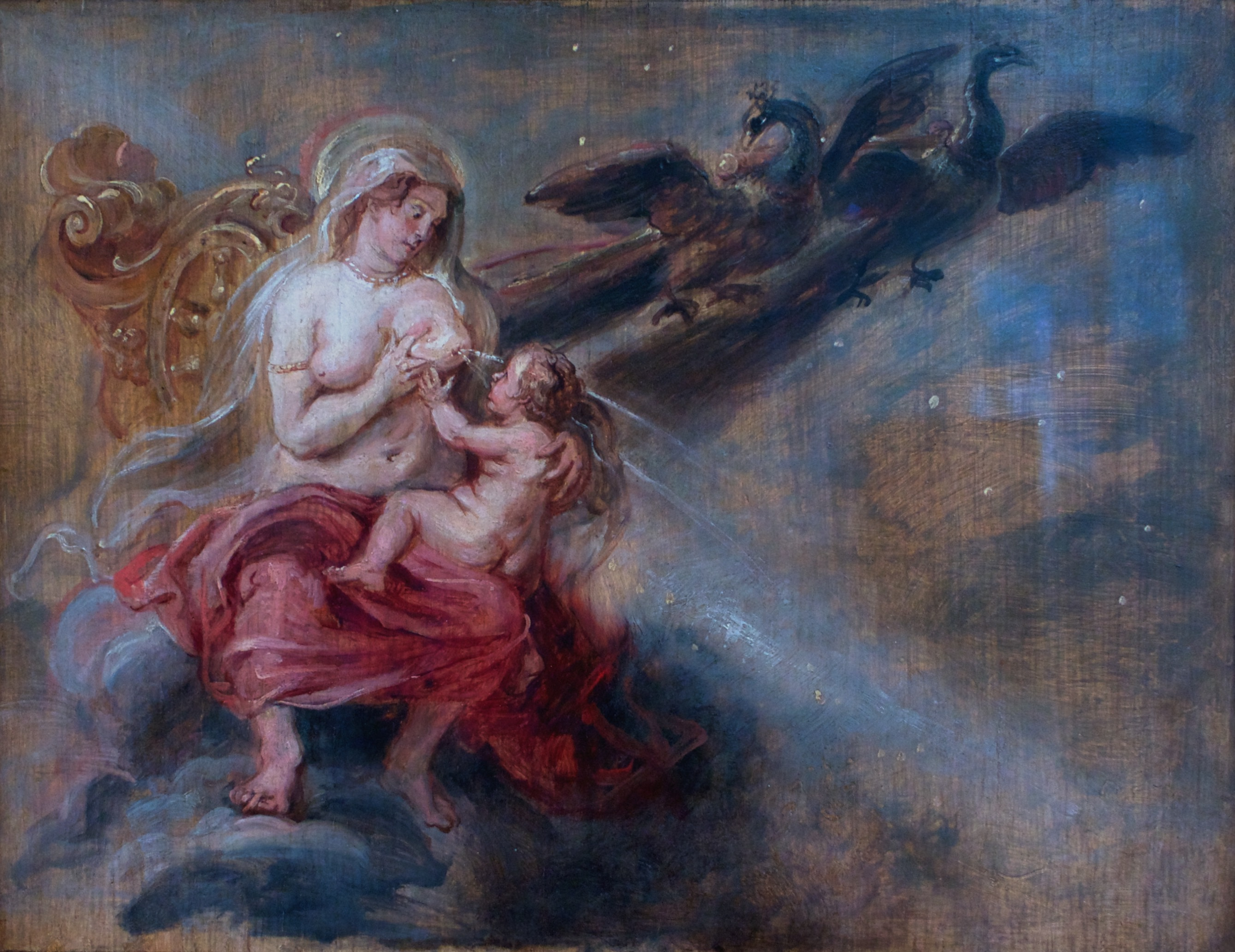
Preparatory study in oil painting. Royal Museums of Fine Arts of Belgium.

Hyginus's De astronomia presents several theories regarding the origin of the Milky Way. One suggests that Hera unknowingly nursed the infant Hermes (Mercury in Roman mythology). When she discovered that the infant was the son of Zeus (Jupiter) and his lover Maia, she pushed him away, causing the flowing white breast milk to form the Milky Way among the constellations. Another version suggests that the infant was Hercules, who was brought to nurse from Hera while she was asleep, but she woke and pushed him away, causing the same thing to happen. Another version suggests that Hercules was so hungry that he was unable to hold all the milk in his mouth, and the milk spilled, forming the Milky Way. Hyginus also suggests that it was Rhea's breast milk.

The version in pseudo-Eratosthenes's Catasterismi is closer to Hyginus' second version: Hermes took Heracles to Hera to feed him with her breast milk, but Hera pushed him away, causing her breast milk to spill and become the Milky Way.

== Production background ==
In 1636, Philip IV commissioned Rubens to decorate the newly remodeled Torre de la Parada, commissioning a massive collection of 63 mythological and 50 hunting scenes. This large-scale commission was arranged through Philip IV's brother, Cardinal Ferdinand of Austria, who was then Governor of the Spanish Netherlands. However, due to the short delivery time, Rubens obtained Philip IV's permission to commission the majority of the work to his former pupils, such as Jacob Jordaens and Jan Boeckhorst, after completing the sketches. Of these, only about 15 works, including this one, are believed to have been completed by Rubens himself. The completed collection was shipped to Madrid in 1638.

== Description ==
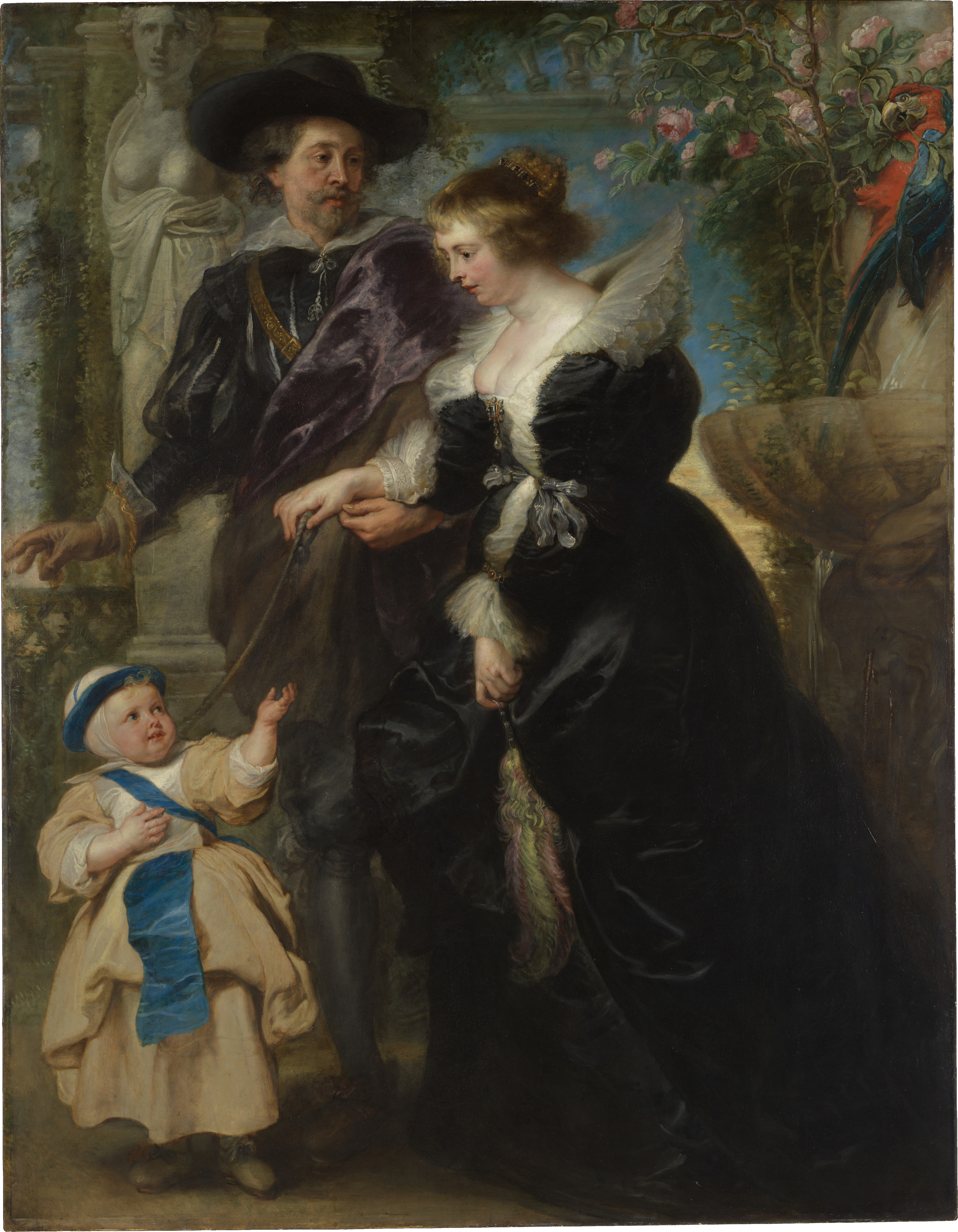
Rubens with his wife Hélène Fourment and their son Frans, Metropolitan Museum of Art

Rubens depicts the scene Hera nursing the infant Hercules. Hera sits on a cloud amid a starry sky. She wears a pearl necklace, jeweled bracelets, and a white veil. Hercules extends his right hand towards Hera's left breast, though he has not yet taken it into his mouth. Milk gushes forth vigorously from the left breast, spreading across the starry sky to form the Milky Way. Presumably, the infant Hercules was placed upon Hera's bosom by Zeus. Behind Hera is a gleaming golden chariot, and behind it, Zeus sits with his right elbow propped up, gazing at the action. Two peacocks are tied to the chariot's shafts. Since peacocks are Hera's attributes, this identifies the chariot as hers. Similarly, the seated male deity is identified as Zeus himself, as his typical attribute, an eagle, soars beneath him. The eagle further grasps Zeus's thunderbolt in its talons. The fact that the infant is not being pushed away and that milk is spurting from its breasts likely reflects Rubens's reinterpretation of the myth.

Ovid's Metamorphoses is commonly used as a reference when depicting a mythological scene. However, because Metamorphoses lacks any rich reference to the myth surrounding the birth of the Milky Way, Rubens turned to other sources, possibly Hyginus. According to Hyginus, Hera not only nurses Heracles, but also Hermes, the messenger of the gods. Art historian Cecil Gould, noting Zeus's presence in the scene, considers the infant to be Hermes rather than Heracles, a view adopted by Svetlana Alpers.

Rubens painted the entire canvas himself. Hera's face is modelled on his second wife, Helena Fourment. Comparison with preparatory sketches preserved in the Royal Museums of Fine Arts of Belgium reveals that Rubens ultimately made several alterations: the position of the goddess's lower limbs was revised, and Zeus and the eagle were added.

== Provenance ==
The painting was recorded in the Torre de la Parada in 1701. After Torre de la Parada burned down during the War of the Spanish Succession, it was moved to the Royal Palace of Madrid, where it was recorded in 1772, 1794, and from 1814 to 1818. Following the death of King Ferdinand VII of Spain, it entered the collection of the Museo del Prado in 1834.

== Related titles ==
Other landscape mythological paintings by Rubens for the Torre de la Parada include:

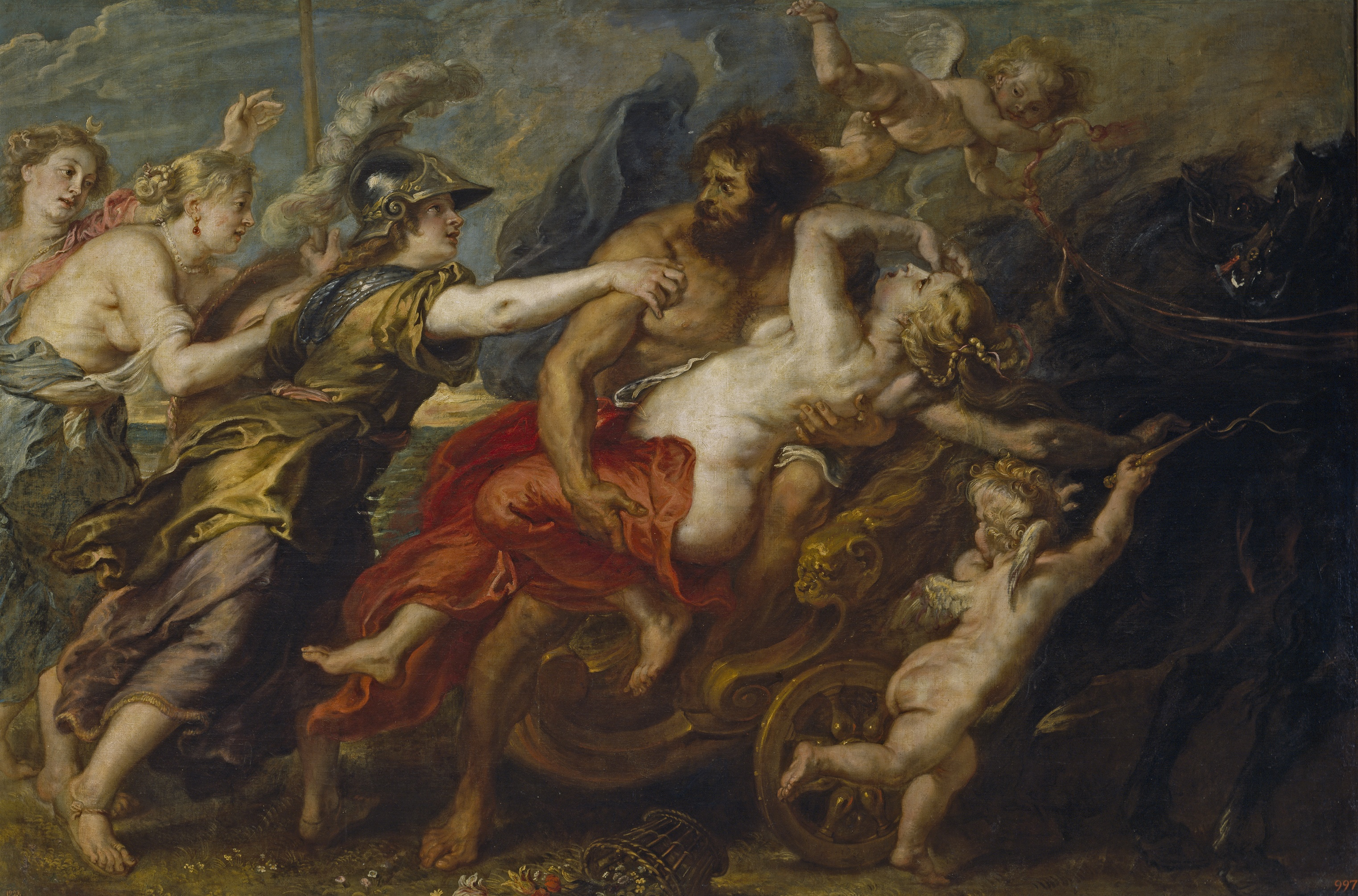
The Rape of Proserpina, 1636–1637

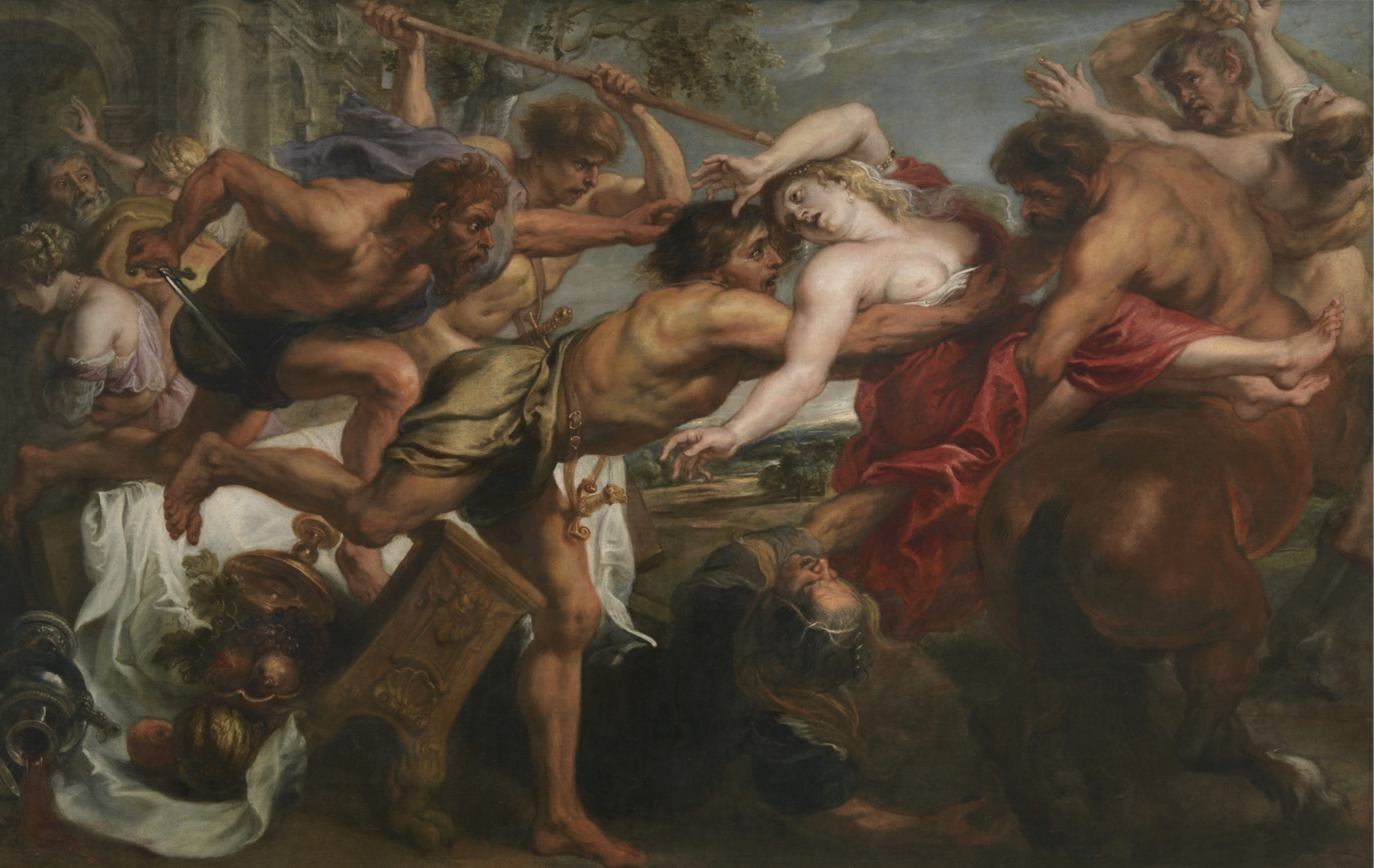
The Rape of Hippodamia, 1636-1637

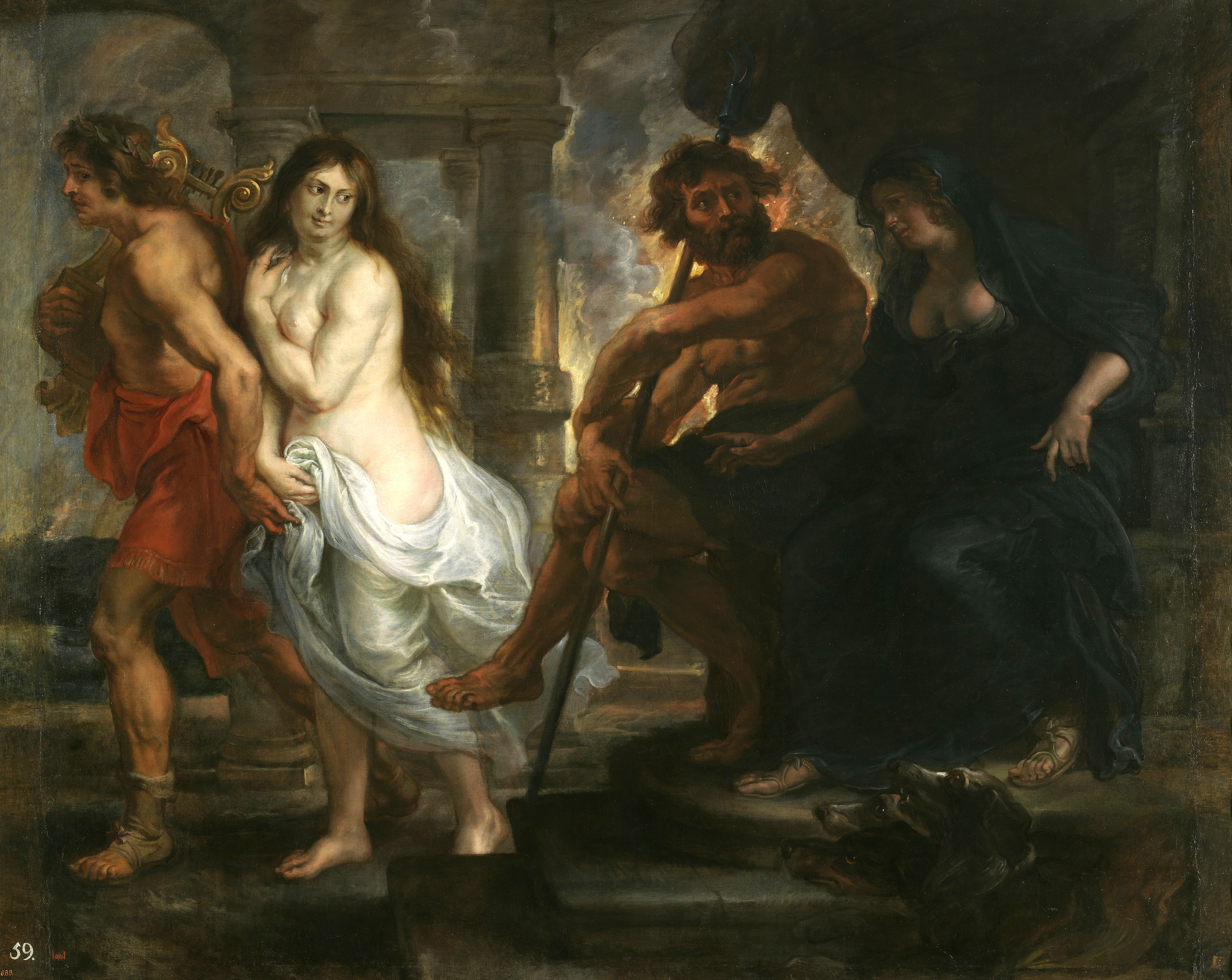
Orpheus and Eurydice, 1636–1638

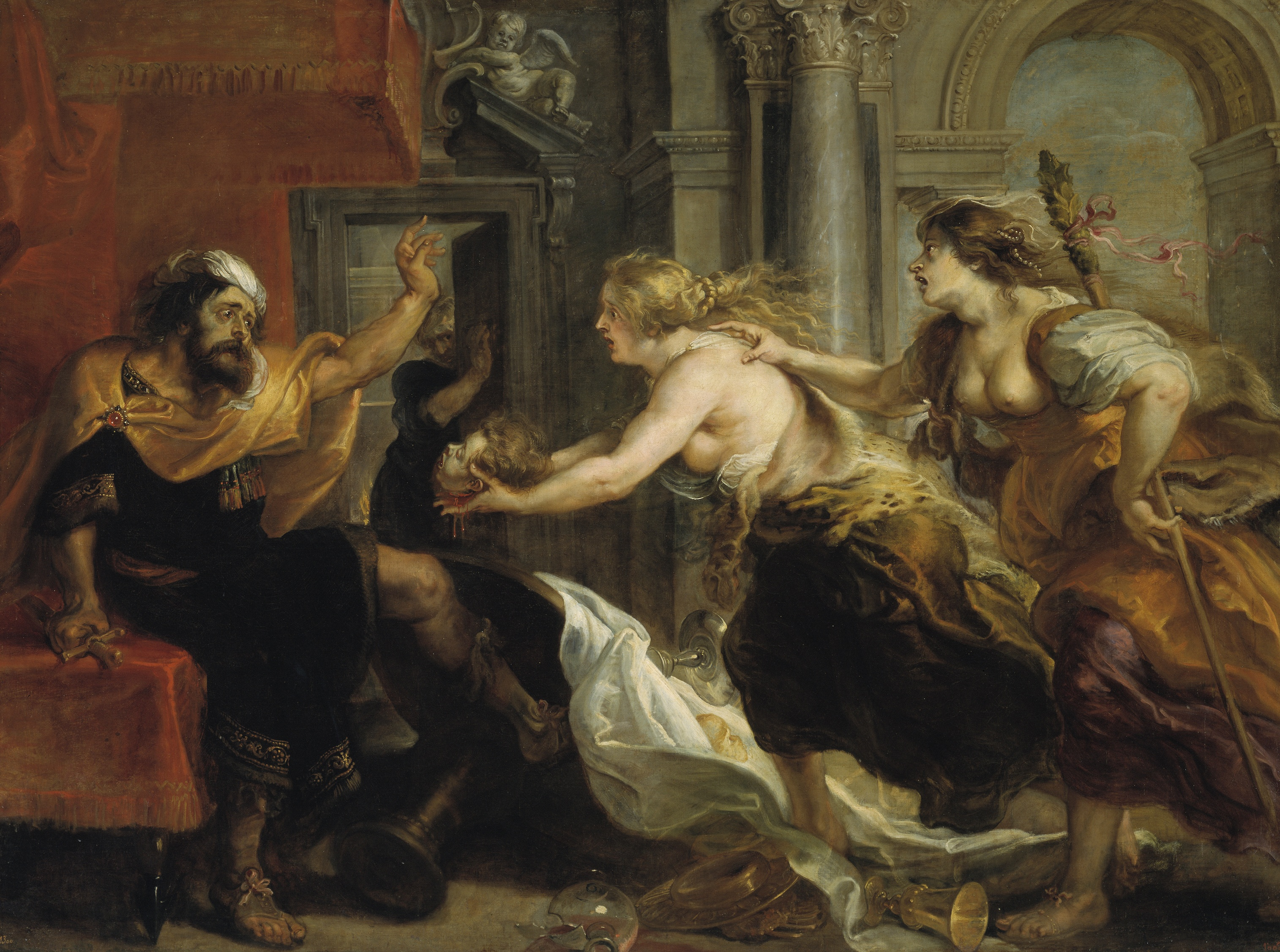
Procne and Philomela Presenting the Head of Their Son to Tereus, 1636-1638

== See also ==
- Breastfeeding in art
- The Origin of the Milky Way (Tintoretto)
- Perseus Freeing Andromeda (Rubens)
