= Perseus and Andromeda (Rubens) =

Painting by Peter Paul Rubens

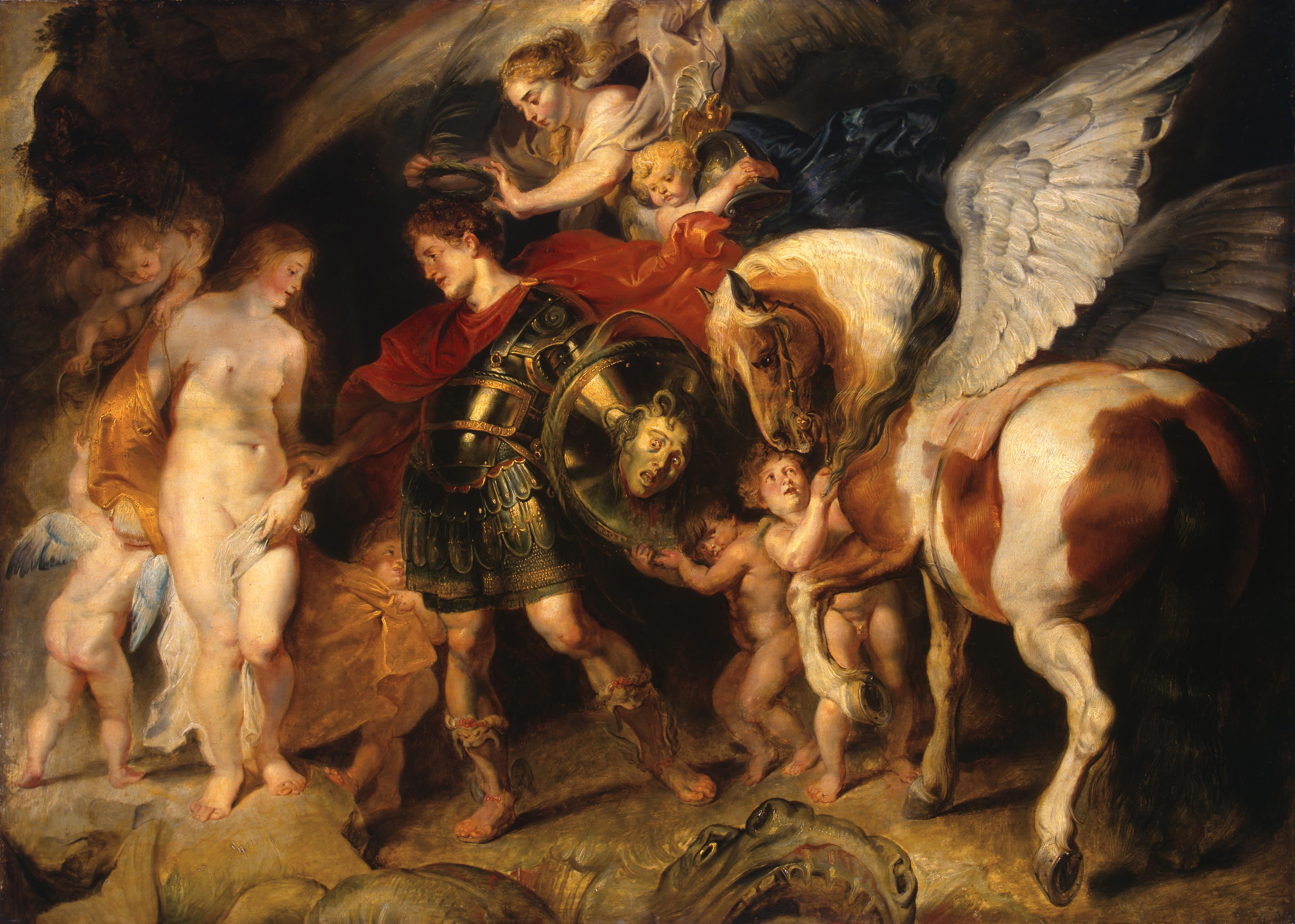
- Artist: Peter Paul Rubens
- Year: c. 1622
- Medium: Oil on canvas
- Dimensions: 99.5 cm × 139 cm (39.2 in × 55 in)
- Location: Hermitage Museum, Saint Petersburg

Perseus and Andromeda is a 1622 painting in the Hermitage Museum by the Flemish artist Peter Paul Rubens of the ancient Greek myth of Perseus and Andromeda after the former's defeat of the Gorgon. The composition is similar to that of an earlier painting by Rubens, Perseus Freeing Andromeda (now in Gemäldegalerie, Berlin).

Perseus, in the centre of the painting, is surrounded by three putti, one holding the shield with Gorgon's reflection, one wearing the hero's helmet, while the third holds the winged horse Tobiano Pegasus. Above, Victory, the goddess of glory, is depicted placing a crown on the hero's head. Two other putti free Andromeda from the rock to which she is tied. Below Cetus, the sea monster defeated by the hero, is shown.

This painting probably remained in Rubens' house until his death; an engraving from 1684, depicting the façade of Rubens' house in Antwerp, shows the painting through the window of the second floor. In the summer of 1769 the painting was acquired by the Russian Hermitage Museum from the collections of Heinrich von Brühl. It is now housed in the Rubens Hall on the second floor of the Hermitage Museum.

== Other versions by Rubens ==
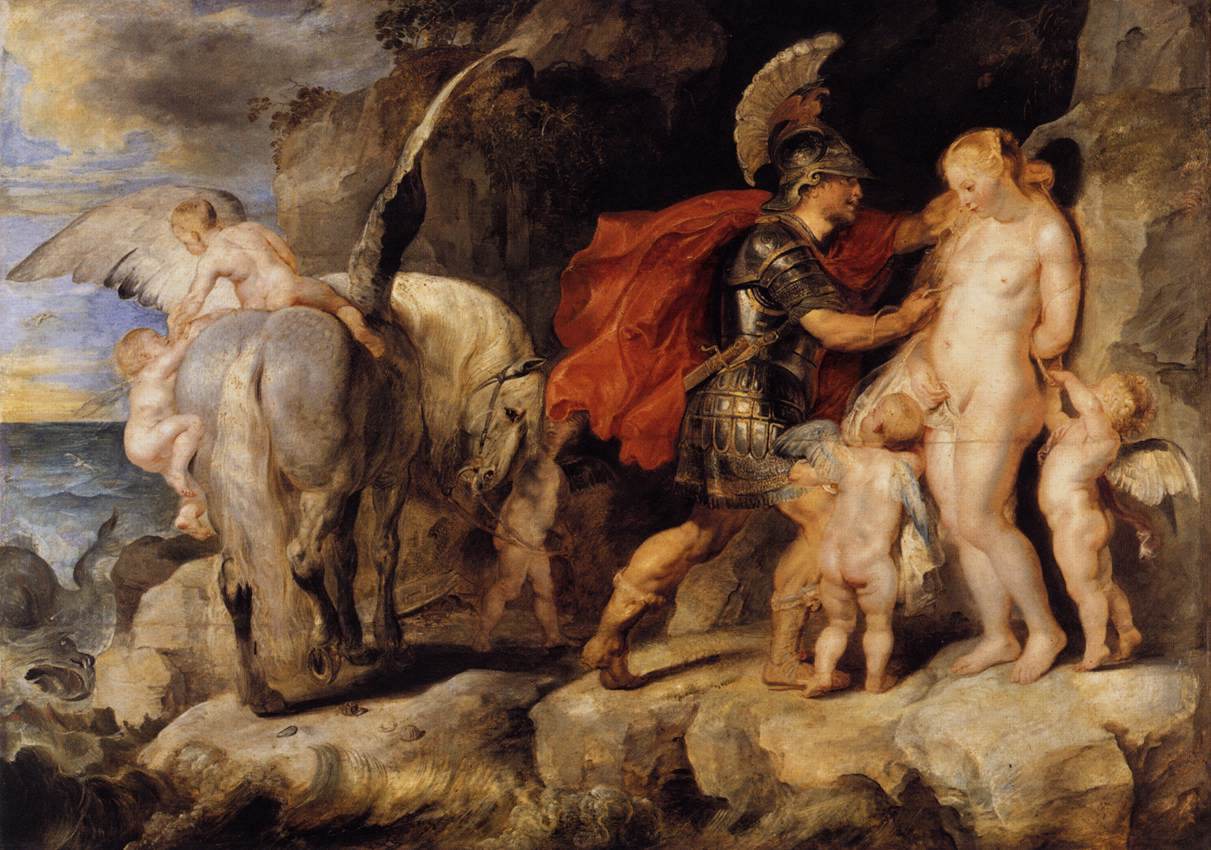
Perseus Freeing Andromeda, Gemäldegalerie

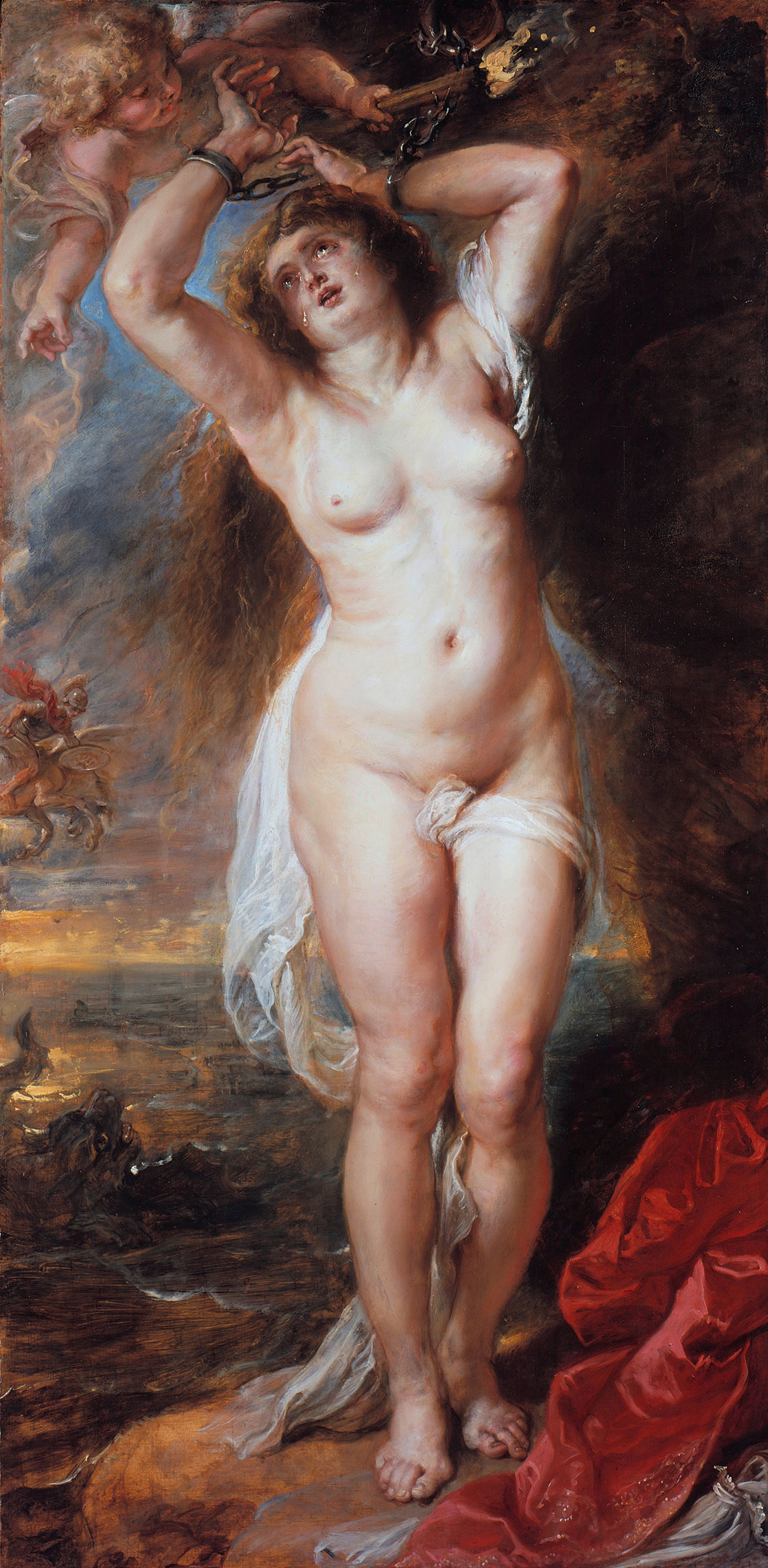
Perseus Freeing Andromeda in the Gemäldegalerie

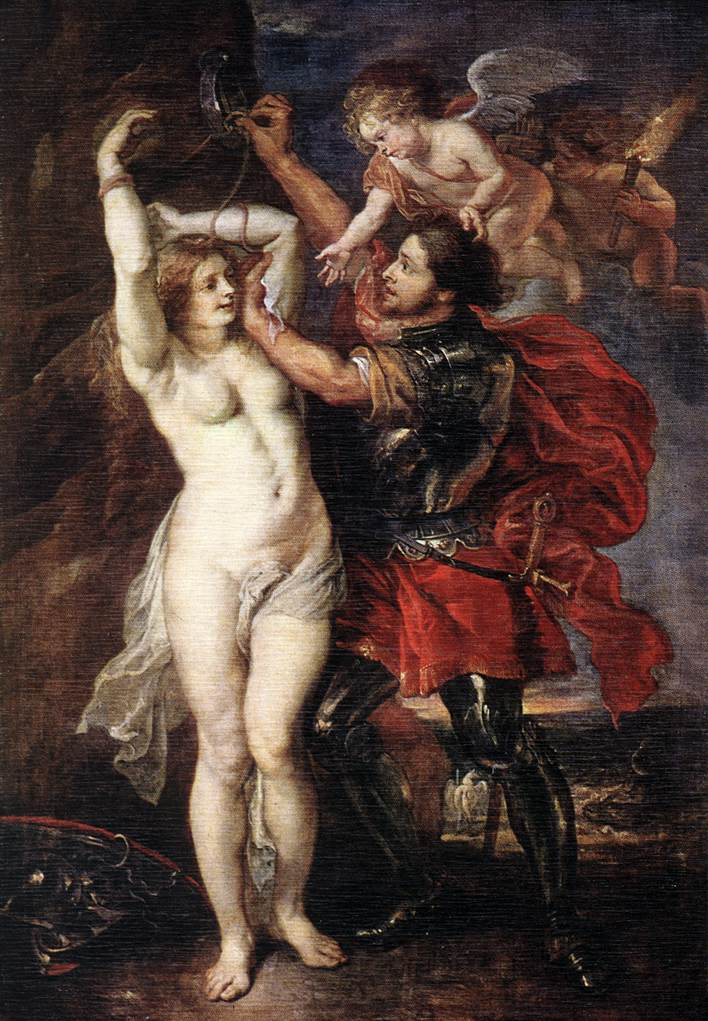
Perseus Freeing Andromeda, Prado Museum

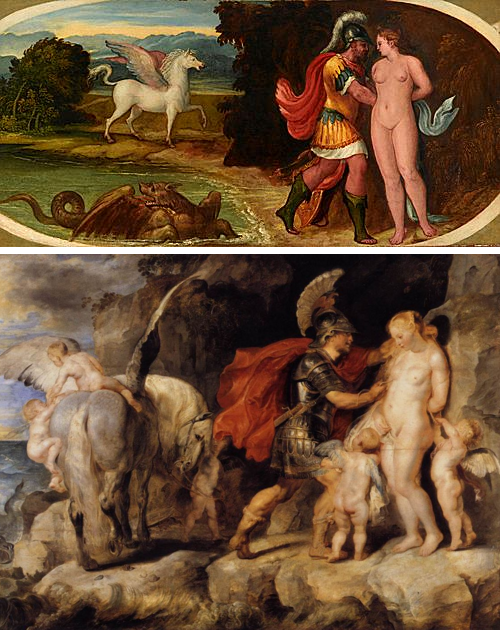
Earlier painting by Lambert Sustris may have served as inspiration for one of the versions
