= Perseus Freeing Andromeda (Wtewael) =

1611 painting by Joachim Wtewael

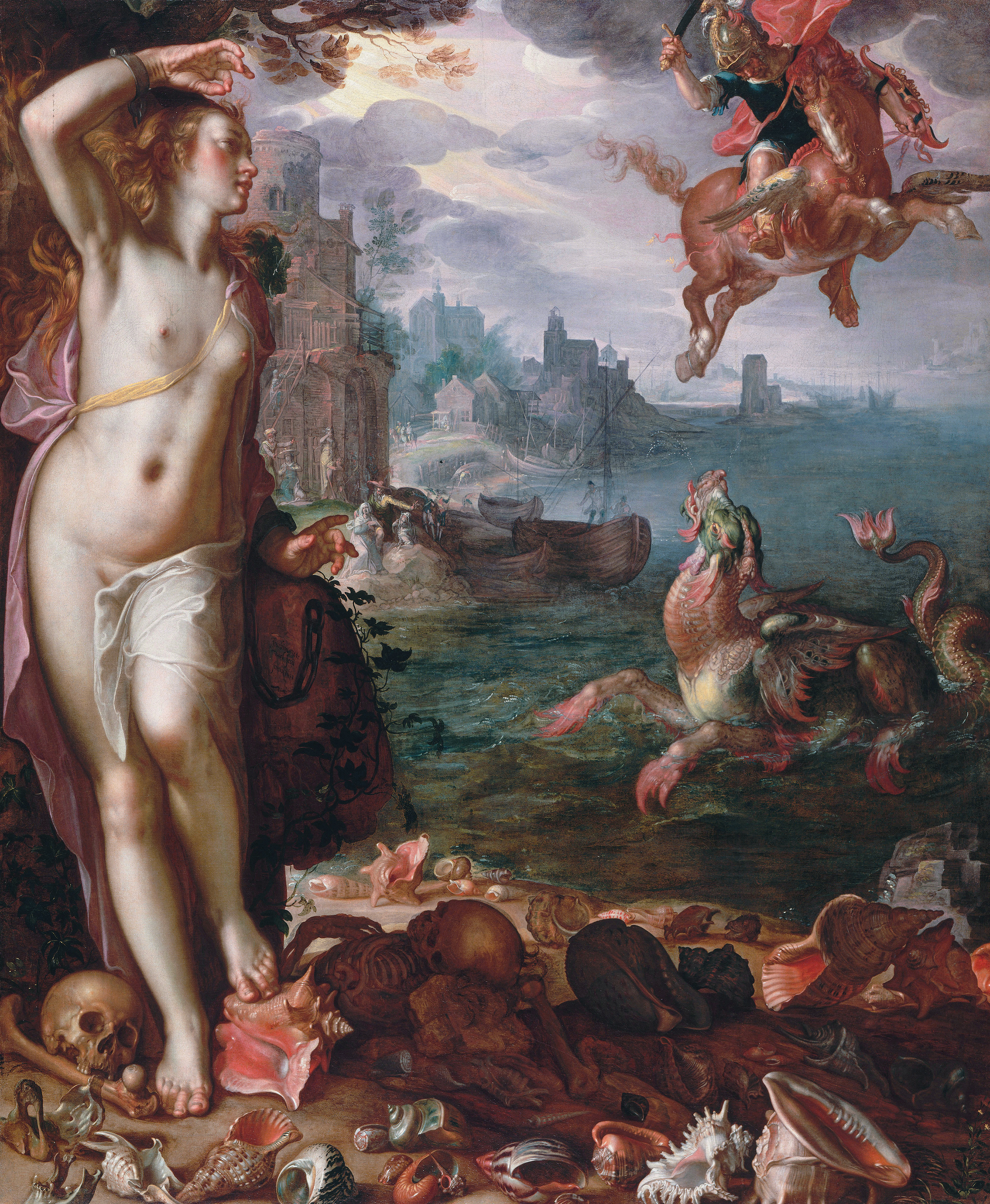
- Artist: Joachim Wtewael
- Year: 1611

Perseus Freeing Andromeda is a 1611 oil-on-canvas painting by the Dutch Mannerist painter Joachim Wtewael. Since 1982, it has been in the collection of the Louvre in Paris. A preparatory drawing for it also survives in the Albertina in Vienna, reprising the pose in the same artist's St Sebastian Bound to a Tree for Andromeda. In the final painting, he used a less curving and more supple pose for Andromeda.
