= The Origin of the Milky Way =

Painting by Tintoretto

- Artist: Tintoretto
- Year: c. 1575–1580
- Medium: Oil on canvas
- Dimensions: 148 cm × 165 cm (58 in × 65 in)
- Location: National Gallery, London

The Origin of the Milky Way is a painting by the Italian Renaissance master Jacopo Tintoretto, in the National Gallery, London, formerly in the Orleans Collection. The painting is considered one of Tintoretto’s most successful paintings in the Venetian style. It is an oil painting on canvas, and dates from ca. 1575–1580.

It is unknown why the bottom third of the painting was cut off, but we do know that it was cut around 1727. The painting holds many symbolic references to the gods and goddesses depicted and the story itself. The painting is further known for its vivid colors that are layered and textured and for keep eyes on the complex details of the pieces.

The myth depicted in the painting is of a Roman mythological story about how the Milky Way was formed. Every part of the painting is meant to further explain the myth by putting imagery that relates to each god/goddess in the myth, i.e. Juno and Jupiter. Other elements further tell the story, such as the putti and the objects they are holding. The painting is an example of the Mannerist style that gained popularity in the late Renaissance. The dynamic, elegant poses and the repeating curves seen throughout the painting are characteristic of the Mannerist style.

Throughout the years, the painting has sustained a variety of damages, some due to age and others due to poor care. Although the painting has been documented to be in the possession of Rudolf II, Holy Roman Emperor, there have been some examinations of the painting that lead art historians to think that the painting had a patron before Rudolf II.

== History ==
=== Patron ===
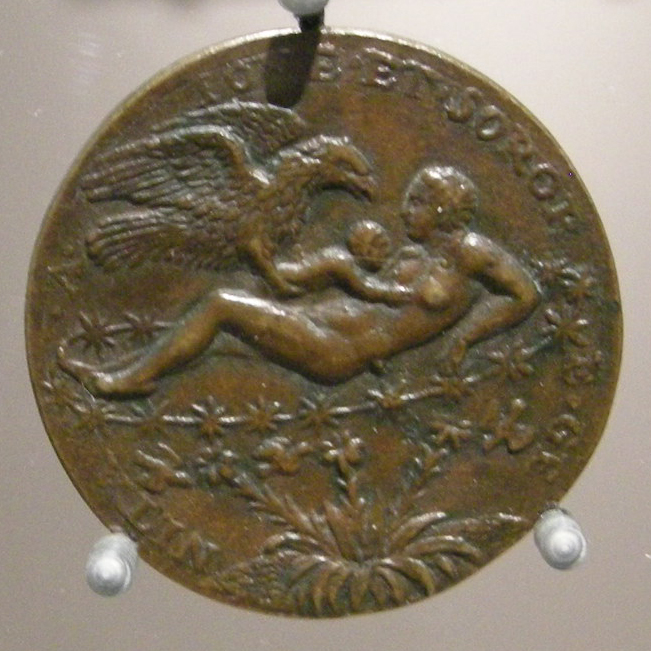
The back of Tommaso Rangone's medal that has similar imagery to The Origin of the Milky Way painting.

While the National Gallery was restoring the painting in 1972, they did an X-ray on the piece and determined that there was an original painting that was carefully painted over. The original painting was of the same scene, but the style was rapidly done and had a firm determination to it. This style of painting wasn't typical of what Tintoretto was doing in his other paintings. Since there is an original painting under the current one, it alludes to the painting perhaps switching patrons before it was completed. This revelation led art historians to theorize that the patron of this painting may have changed during its creation. It is thought that the painting was originally commissioned by Tommaso Rangone, a physician and academic in Venice. Rangone commissioned many well-known works from Tintoretto and likely commissioned The Origin of the Milky Way as well. As an astrologist and a physician, Rangone had an interest in the night sky and flowers and was often depicted with the two. With this in mind, The Origin of the Milky Way has imagery that fits with Rangone’s interests. Rangone’s whole career revolved around longevity which would align with the myth of The Origin of the Milky Way where Jupiter tried to make Hercules immortal by drinking Juno’s breast milk. A similar image that is seen in the painting is further engraved on a personal medal that Rangone had cast in 1562. There were documents showing receipts that proved that Rangone commissioned and paid for a series of paintings from Tintoretto to paint. The purpose of these paintings listed on the receipts was to honor the life of St. Mark for the Scuola Grande di San Marco in Venice. Although The Origin of the Milky Way wasn't specifically listed on the receipt, the painting does fall in line with his tastes. Perhaps the first “rapid” version of the painting was meant for Rangone. However, the doctor ended up dying in 1577 leading to the painting switching patrons to a new buyer, Emperor Rudolf II.

The patron who certainly had possession of this painting was the Holy Roman Emperor Rudolf II of Prague. Like Rangone, Rudolf II too had an interest in astronomy, alchemy, and immortality. Many people during the Renaissance found an interest in alchemy and Rudolf II was no exception. The main reason that Rudolf II took an interest in alchemy was in the hope of finding the "philosopher's stone," a stone that can change metal to gold and grant the person in possession of it immortality. The Origin of the Milky Way is a painting that touches circles on the theme of immortality which aligns with Rudolf II's interests. Another factor that shows why Rudolf II took an interest in this painting is because the Habsburg family had a tradition of modeling themselves after Hercules to be a just and protective ruler. Rudolf II also ended up modeling himself after the Roman hero and even showed himself wearing a lion skin and holding a club, both iconic items that are associated with Hercules. Although he had trouble following this model during his time on the throne, he still pursued his interest in being a patron and collector of fine art. Both the subject matter and the erotic attributes of The Origin of the Milky Way suited Rudolf II's tastes, even though he refused to marry he still found visual enjoyment in erotic imagery. It is likely that Rudolf II's official “antiquary” advisor, Mantuan Ottavio Strada, purchased four fable paintings from Tintoretto each depicting the legend of Hercules. Although the painting isn't specifically named in the Emperor's collection, there is a pamphlet written in 1648 that mentioned a painting by Tintoretto titled Jupiter Holding a Little Bacchus to Juno's Breast. It is assumed that the writer mistook Hercules for Bacchus, but this still implies that the painting was likely hung in Prague Castle.

=== Damage ===
The painting suffered some damage over the years, the most glaring is the missing third that was cut off. The two sides of the canvas are frayed and ragged due to the canvas being distorted by the tension of being stretched awkwardly on the stretcher. However, the top and bottom edges of the canvas have straight threads, showing that the bottom was cleanly and carefully cut off to avoid paint loss. The painting also had two linings ironed on that flattened the paint on the surface. The edges further had layered adhesive that resulted in the painting not being stretched evenly. The edges were also frayed from being overstretched on a small canvas for many years. Furthermore, two horizontal creases were found running from the bottom of the piece to Juno's ankle, and the other 13 cm from the top to the top edge. These horizontal creases came from transporting the painting to Rudolf II's castle. A closer examination of the horizontal lines revealed that the paint above and below the lines was cracked. This suggests that the horizontal lines are the result of the painting being folded and unfolded before the paint could get old enough to crack. The obvious reason why the canvas was folded not long after painting would be for transportation purposes. During this time, it would be common to transport paintings by muleback or coach. The canvas would even be removed from the stretcher to be rolled up or folded for easier transportation. Looking back on the horizontal lines and comparing them to the full sketch of what the painting looked like, it looks as though the painting was indeed folded in half. It was likely that the painting was folded in half to reduce the amount of space it would take up on the journey to Emperor Rudolf II's castle in Prague.

== Description ==
=== Subject matter ===
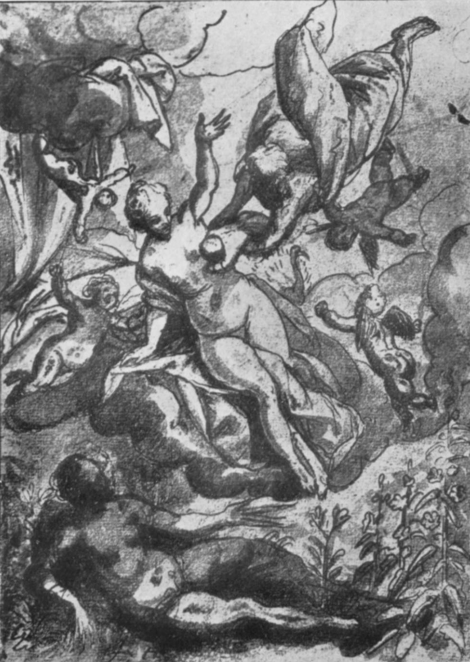
A sketch by the imperial court painter Jacob Hoefnagel that shows what the original painting looked like.

The painting depicts Jupiter, god of the sky and king of the gods, who is depicted wearing red. Juno, the goddess of marriage and queen of the gods, is the woman in the bed, and Hercules the illegitimate son of Jupiter and the mortal woman Alcmene. The story in the painting is of the Roman Mythological story of how the Milky Way was formed. According to the legend, Jupiter wanted to make his son, Hercules, immortal by having him drink the breast milk of his sleeping goddess wife Juno. After feeling a pinch, she awakens to a strange child nursing from her breast, seeing this she quickly jerks away resulting in breast milk being spurted upward forming the Milky Way. The breast milk being spurted downward created white lilies, but this is seen in the lost portion of the painting. The Milky Way is a hazy cloud seen during the night sky that is depicted behind the eagle, and the stars of the Milky Way which are being formed as the milk leaves Juno’s breast. Beside Juno are peacocks, her symbolic animal that is often seen with her. Under Jupiter is an eagle, often associated with Jupiter as his symbolic animal and his messenger, clutching his lightning bolt in its talons.

Tintoretto’s composition was likely inspired by a passage in the epic Ercole by Giovanni Battista Giraldi. The narration in this passage describes how Jupiter gave his son, Hercules, immortality. Moreover, it seems that Tintoretto further took inspiration from the Byzantine herbal, Geoponica, that talks about the creation of lilies and the legend of Hercules. This epic leads to the inspiration of the bottom third of the painting, a woman who may have been the embodiment of Earth and the mother of Jupiter and Juno. The Geoponica was originally in Greek and translated to Italian and published in Venice in 1549, while the epic Ercole was published in Modena in 1557.

=== Composition ===
Tintoretto usually relies on body language and dynamic poses to create compositions that look active. Tintoretto took great care in making the human form look like it is in motion. He paid attention to the way the muscles tense and the skin flexes to get the illusion of movement. The subtle tones on Juno's skin and the transparent layering of colors creates the appearance that the flesh is turning. Even in rest he paid attention to how the muscles relax and tense in certain areas when in rest. That attention to detail is very apparent in this painting as well, especially in the way Juno is posed. The Origin of the Milky Way is a Mannerist piece due to the dynamic movement and exaggerated forms of the figures. Juno’s pose is particularly Mannerist because of how elegant, performative, and complex it is. The complexity of the pose comes from how she is moving in opposite directions simultaneously. The body is twisted in unnatural directions that allow her to look as those she is moving in opposite directions simultaneously. Her upper body and head are moving up while she is leaning forward, allowing her body to twist in multiple directions to show the milk spraying in two different directions. The overall composition of the painting has repeating curved shapes such as the curve of Juno’s pose and the curve of Jupiter’s back, which are characteristic of Mannerist painting.

== Symbolism ==
The four Putti, also known as cupids, are each holding a symbolic item that symbolizes the good and bad parts of love: The putti holding the chains by Juno's arm represents marriage, The putti holding the torch coming from the bottom left of the painting represents the passion of love, The putti holding the bow and arrow by Juno's peacocks represents love, and the putti holding the net by Jupiter represents deception. The addition of the putti makes the theme of love and deceit in this mythological scene more prevalent.

== See also ==
- Breastfeeding in art
- The Origin of the Milky Way (Rubens)
