= Perseus Freeing Andromeda (Rubens) =

Painting by Peter Paul Rubens

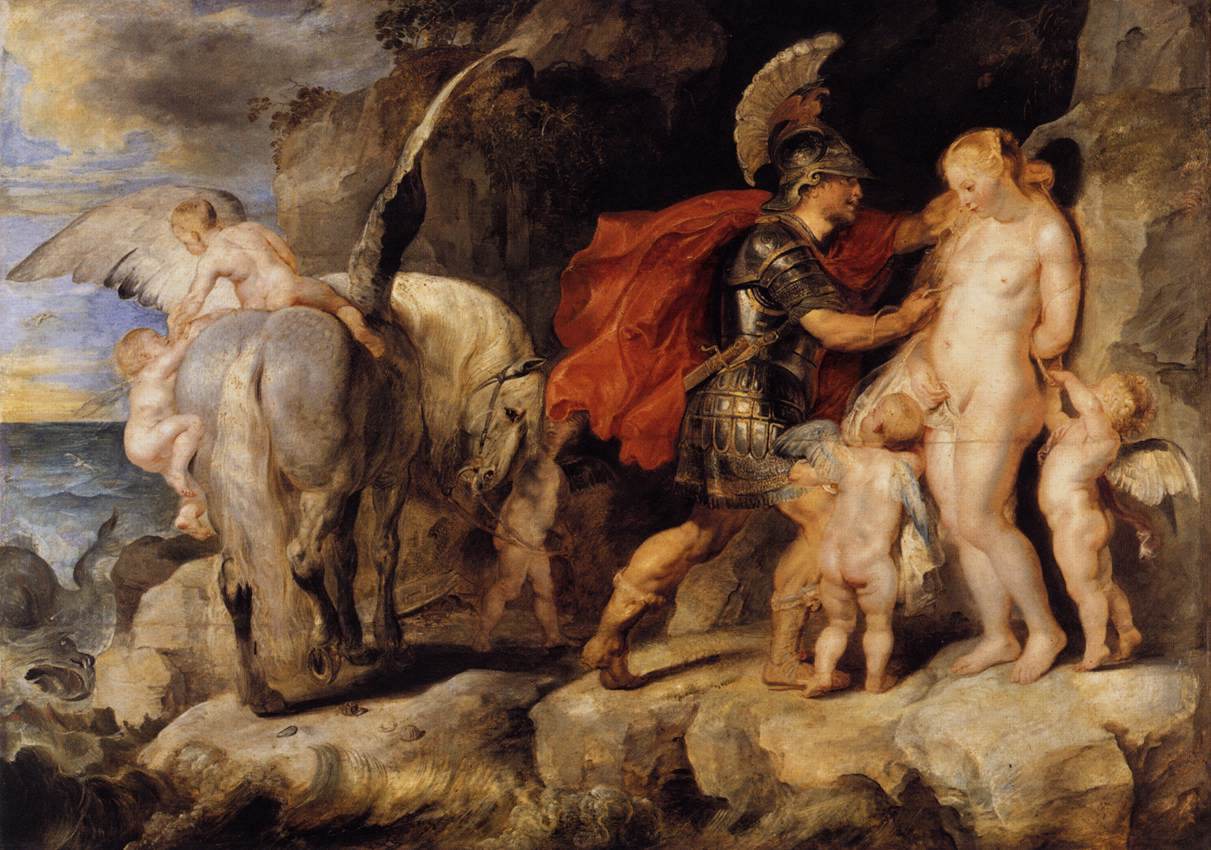
- Artist: Peter Paul Rubens
- Year: 1620, possibly 1622
- Medium: Oil on panel
- Dimensions: 100 cm × 138.5 cm (39 in × 54.5 in)
- Location: Gemäldegalerie, Berlin

Perseus Freeing Andromeda is a painting by the Flemish artist Peter Paul Rubens, dated to 1620, with some sources claiming 1622. It is now in the Gemäldegalerie, Berlin, Germany.

Prior to 1755, the painting belonged to a Monsieur Pasquier, as part of his collection in Rouen, France. The painting was auctioned in 1755 in Paris. In the 18th century it entered the collection of Frederick II of Prussia and, in 1830, it became part of the collection of the Berlin museums.

The scene is similar to another painting by Rubens, Perseus and Andromeda, now in the Hermitage Museum of St. Petersburg. It depicts the Greek mythology hero Perseus in the act of freeing Andromeda, after defeating the sea monster which kept her prisoner. Perseus, wearing helmet, cuirass, and cloak, is sided by two puttoes, and one of them is helping him in removing the ropes that tie Andromeda to the rock.

On the left, two puttoes are playing with Pegasus, Perseus’ winged horse.

== Gallery ==
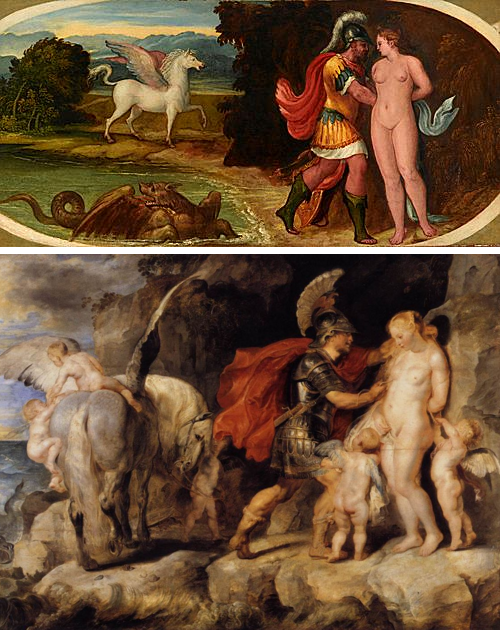
Earlier painting by Lambert Sustris may have served as inspiration for this painting

== Sources ==
- Jaffé, M. (1989). Catalogo completo di Rubens. Rizzoli. p. 375.
