= Caristia =

Holiday in ancient Rome

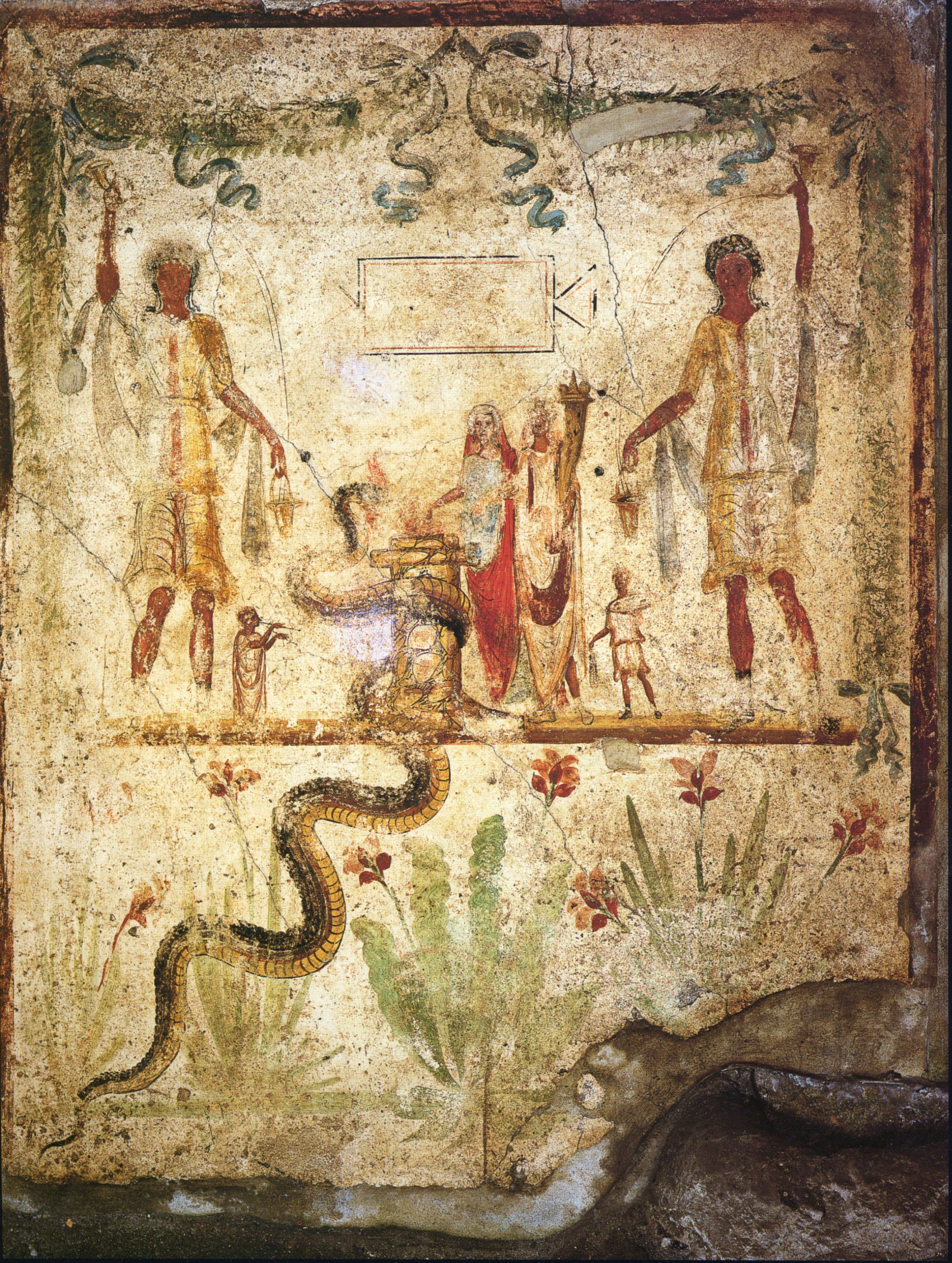
- Ancestral sacrifices depicted in the lararium of the house of Julius Polybius in Pompeii
- Observed by: Roman Republic, Roman Empire
- Type: Classical Roman religion
- Celebrations: family dinners, gifts (sportulae), distributions of bread and wine
- Observances: offerings to the Lares
- Date: February 22
- Related to: Parentalia and ancestor cultus

In ancient Rome, the Caristia, also known as the Cara Cognatio, was an official but privately observed holiday on February 22 that celebrated love of family with banqueting and gifts. Families gathered to dine together and offer food and incense to the Lares as their household gods. It was a day of reconciliation when disagreements were to be set aside, but the poet Ovid observes satirically that this could be achieved only by excluding family members who caused trouble.

== Practices ==
The Caristia was one of several days in February that honored family or ancestors. It followed the Parentalia, nine days of remembrance which began on February 13 and concluded with the Feralia on February 21, or in the view of some, the Caristia on the next day. For the Parentalia, families visited the tombs of their ancestors and shared cake and wine, both in the form of offerings and as a meal among themselves. The Feralia was a more somber occasion, a public festival of sacrifices and offerings to the Manes, the spirits of the dead who required propitiation. The Caristia was a recognition of the family line as it continued into the present and among the living.

There were distributions of bread, wine, and sportulae (bonuses, tips, tokens of appreciation). The poet Martial has a pair of poems on gift-giving for the holiday; in one, he offers a sort of "non-apology apology" to his relatives Stella and Flaccus, explaining that he's sent them nothing because he didn't want to offend others who ought to receive a gift from him and wouldn't.

== On the calendar ==
Unlike public festivals, the Caristia and other privately observed holidays were allowed to fall on even-numbered days of the Roman calendar. The Cara Cognatio remained on the calendar long after the Roman Empire had come under Christian rule. It appeared in the Chronography of 354, and the calendar of Polemius Silvius (449 AD) juxtaposed the old holiday with a feast day commemorating the burial of St. Peter and St. Paul. As a "love feast," the Caristia was not incompatible with Christian attitudes; some scholars have detected an influence of the Parentalia and Caristia on the Christian agape feast, with the consumption of bread and wine at the ancestral tomb replaced by the Eucharist. In the 5th century, some Christian priests even encouraged participation in funerary meals.

In the first half of the 6th century, some Gallo-Romans still observed a form of the holiday with food offerings to the dead and a ritual meal. By then, however, the practice had come under suspicion as a "pagan" ritual, and the Council of Tours in 567 explicitly censured those who "defiled" the feast day of St. Peter. The observances were condemned by Caesarius of Arles as an excuse for drunkenness, dancing, singing, and other "demonic" behaviors. The suppression of traditional commemorations of the dead were part of increasing efforts by the Church to control and monopolize religious behaviors in Merovingian Gaul.
