= Lapis manalis =

Roman sacred stones

A lapis manalis was either of two sacred stones used in the Roman religion. Although they had the same name, they were distinct stones: one the cover to the gate of the underworld and the other a rainmaking stone.

== Gate to the underworld ==
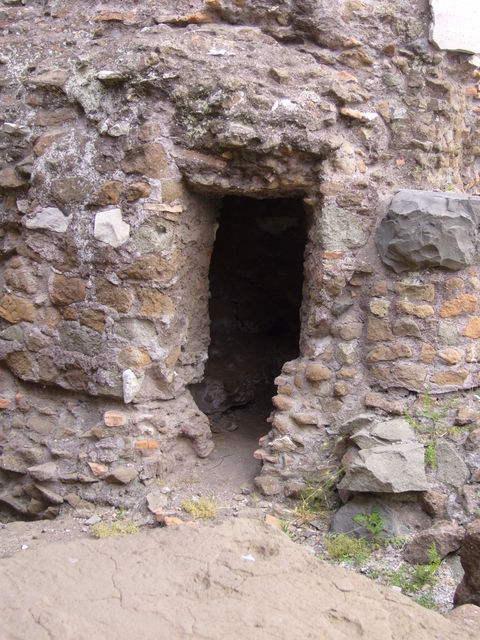
Plutarch linked the Roman mundus to the religious center of the city of Rome, the umbilicus urbis Romae.

One lapis manalis covered the mundus Cereris, a pit thought to contain an entrance to the underworld. The grammarian Festus called it ostium Orci, "the gate of Orcus". Most cities of Latium and Etruria contained a similar pit or ditch; Plutarch describes the custom of a mundus as being of Etruscan origin, and states that it was used as a place where first-fruits were deposited. The Latin word mundus meant "world". Festus, quoting Cato this time, explains that:

Mundo nomen impositum est ab eo mundo qui supra nos est.

(The mundus gets its name from that world which is above us.)

The Roman mundus was located in the Comitium. This stone was ceremonially opened three times a year, during which spirits of the blessed dead (the Manes) were able to commune with the living. The three days upon which the mundus was opened were August 24, October 5, and November 8. Fruits of the harvest were offered to the dead at this time. Macrobius, quoting Varro, says of these days that:

Mundus cum patet, deorum tristium atque inferum quasi ianua patet.

(When the mundus is open, it is as if a door stands open for the sorrowful gods of the underworld.)

Accordingly, he reports that military and public matters were not transacted upon them, even though they were not dies nefasti.

== Charm to make rain ==
The other lapis was used as part of a ceremony called the aquaelicium (Latin: "calling the waters") which sought to produce rain in times of drought. During the ceremony, the pontifices had the stone brought from its usual resting place, the Temple of Mars in Clivo near the Porta Capena, into the Senate. Offerings were made to Jupiter petitioning for rain, and water was ceremonially poured over the stone. The name of this stone may have been derived from the verb manare, "to flow".

== See also ==
- Lemuria, another Roman festival for the dead.
- Lemures, hostile ghosts in Roman mythology.
