= Compitalia =

Ancient Roman festival honoring the deities of the crossroads

The Compitalia (Latin: Ludi Compitalicii; from compitum 'cross-way') was an annual festival in ancient Roman religion held in honor of the Lares Compitales, household deities of the crossroads, to whom sacrifices were offered at the places where two or more ways met.

== History ==
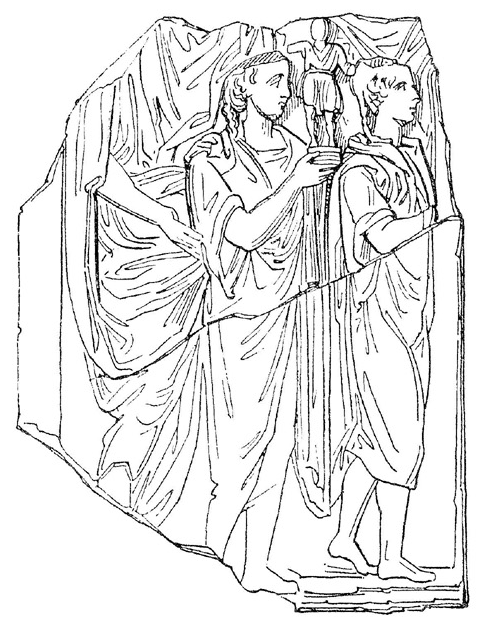
Procession of the Compitalia, drawing from a fragment of bas-relief in the former Lateran Museum

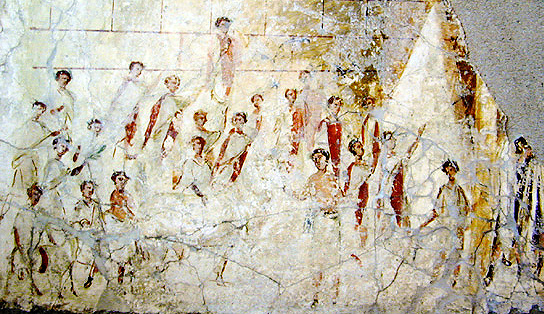
A rare fresco from a building near Pompeii, depicting Roman men in togae praetextae with dark red borders and probably participating in the Compitalia

This festival is more ancient than the building of Rome. According to the classicist Harriet Flower, given that the specific date of the ceremony varied, and that it was announced by a praetor, the holiday perhaps dates back to a period when celebrations were "communicated orally within a tightknit community." It is said by some writers to have been instituted by Tarquinius Priscus in consequence of the miracle attending the birth of Servius Tullius, who was supposed to be the son of a Lar Familiaris, or family guardian deity.

Dionysius says that Servius Tullius founded the festival, which he describes as it was celebrated in his time. Dionysius relates that the sacrifices consisted of honey-cakes (Ancient Greek: πέλανοι) presented by the inhabitants of each house; and that the people who assisted as ministering servants at the festival were not free men, but slaves, because the Lares took pleasure in the service of slaves. He further adds that the Compitalia were celebrated a few days after the Saturnalia with great splendor, and that the slaves on this occasion had full liberty to do as they pleased.

Macrobius, a 5th-century author, says that the celebration of the Compitalia was restored by the Etruscan king Tarquinius Superbus in response to an oracle that "they should sacrifice heads (capita) for heads." The oracle was taken to mean that in order to maintain the health and prosperity of each family, children should be sacrificed to Mania, identified in this case as the mother of the Lares. But Brutus, after overthrowing the line of Tarquin kings, instead satisfied the oracle by exploiting a verbal loophole, substituting "heads" of garlic and poppies.

During the civil wars of the 40s, the festival fell into disuse, and was accordingly restored during the program of religious reforms carried out by Augustus. As Augustus was now the pater patriae, the worship of the old Lares was discontinued, and the Lares of the emperor consequently became the Lares of the state. Augustus set up altars to neighbourhood Lares or penates at places where two or more ways met and instituted an order of priests to attend to their worship. These priests were chosen from the libertini, people who had been legally freed from slavery, and were called Augustales.

== Ceremony ==
During the celebration of the festival, each family placed the statue of the underworld goddess Mania at the door of their house. Festus, a 2nd-century Roman grammarian, records that—during the ceremony—woolen effigies were hung up on the compita, which were shrines situated at crossroads. Macrobius describes a similar practice during the Compitalia wherein images of Mania were hung before the doors of households. According to the classicist Louise Holland, the specific practice detailed by Macrobius probably developed in urban environments where the population of a vicus may be too large for a single altar to store the requisite offerings. These statuettes were accompanied by humble requests that the Lares and Mania would be contented with those figures, and spare the people of the house. Slaves offered balls or fleeces of wool instead of human figures.

The people who presided over the festival were magistri vici ("neighborhood officers"), who were freedmen, and on that occasion were allowed to wear the toga praetexta, which was normally worn by civic magistrates. The holiday in general was dedicated to common farm laborers and slaves, for whom it provided a valuable day of rest. Cato the Elder, a 2nd-century BCE Roman statesman, recommended that servants and slaves receive 3 1/2 congii of wine during the festival. Public games were added to the festival during the Republican period, but they were suppressed by command of the senate in 68 BCE. Calpurnius Piso was charged by Cicero with violating the decree by allowing the games to be celebrated during his consulship in 58. The festival itself still continued to be observed, even if the games were abolished.

The Compitalia belonged to the feriae conceptivae, that is, festivals which were celebrated on days appointed annually by the magistrates or priests. The ancient Roman authors Aulus Gellius, a 2nd-century Roman writer, and also Macrobius both record that the Compitalia was announced specifically by the praetor, probably—according to the classicist John Scheid—an urban praetor, who uttered the exact phrase "die noni popolo romano quiritibus compitalia erunt" ("On the ninth day the Roman people, the Quirites, will celebrate the Compitalia"). The exact day on which this festival was celebrated appears to have varied, though it was always in the winter, at least in the time of Varro, as observed by Isaac Casaubon. Dionysius again relates that it was celebrated a few days after the Saturnalia, and Cicero that it fell on the Kalends of January; but in one of his letters to Atticus, he speaks of it as occurring on the fourth before the Nones of January (January 2).

Suetonius writes that Augustus ordered the Lares Compitales crowned twice yearly with spring and summer flowers ("Compitales Lares ornari bis anno instituit vernis floribus et aestivis").
