= Larunda =

Naiad nymph in Ovid's "Fasti"

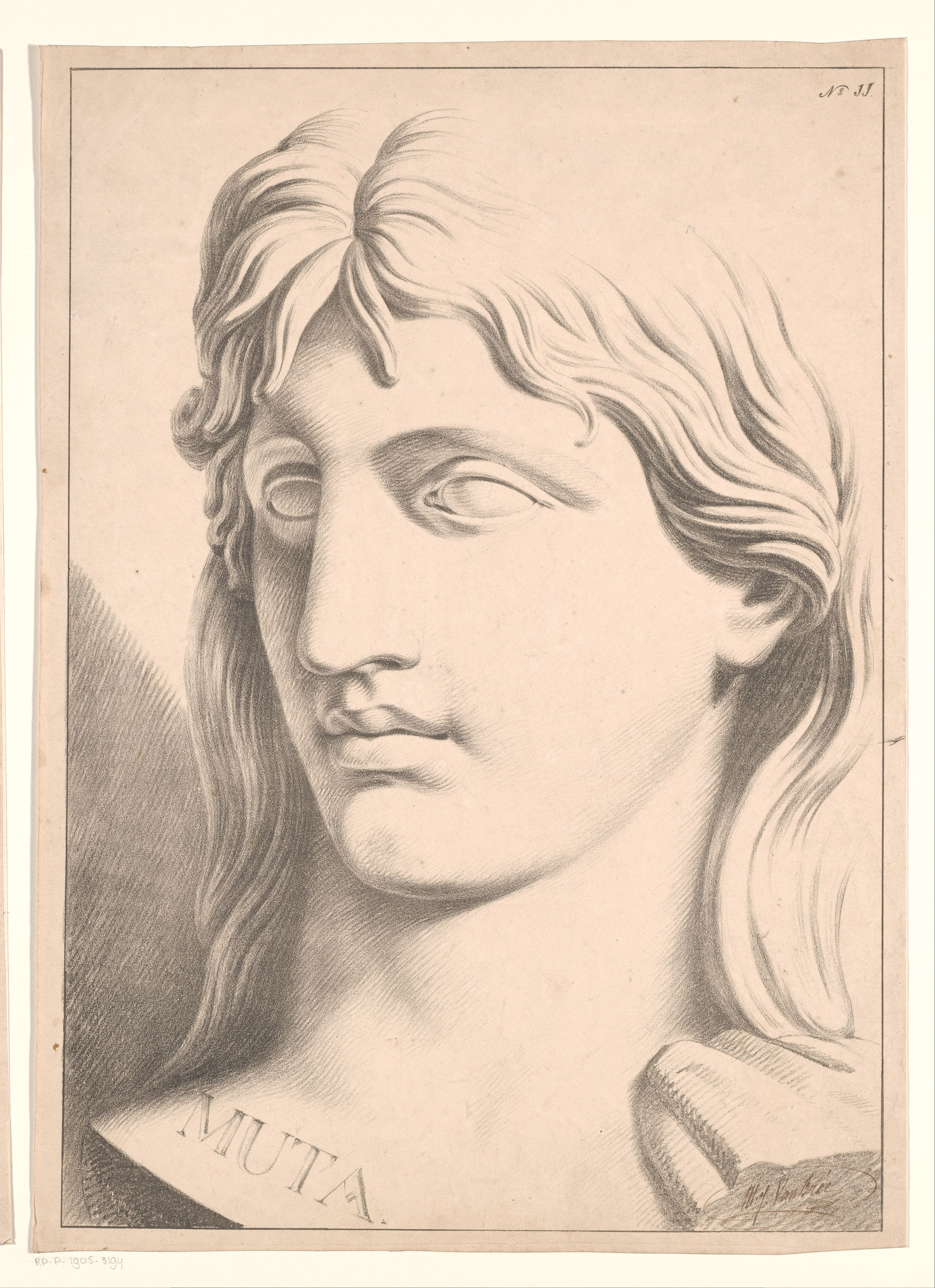
Dea Muta, identified with Lara or Larunda, print (ca. 1809–1839) by Mattheus Ignatius van Bree

Larunda (also Larunde, Laranda, Lara) was a naiad nymph, daughter of the river Almo and mother of the Lares Compitalici, guardians of the crossroads and the city of Rome. In Ovid's Fasti she is named Lara.

== Myth ==
Ovid's Fasti provides the only known mythography attached to Larunda. Ovid names her Lara, an excessively loquacious river-nymph, daughter of the river-god Almo. Ignoring parental advice to curb her tongue, she betrays Jupiter's secret, adulterous affair with the nymph Juturna, wife of Janus, to his own wife, Juno. Jupiter wrenches out Lara's tongue and orders Mercury, psychopomp and god of boundaries and transitions, to conduct her to the "infernal marshes" of Avernus, the gateway to the Underworld, the dismal realm of Pluto. Along the way, Mercury rapes her, despite her pleading expression. Mute and silent, she thus conceives the divine Lares, twin guardians of crossroads and the city of Rome.

Lara's original name, according to Ovid, was "Lala", imitative of her garulous speech. Robbed of the power of speech, she was thought by the Christian writer Lactantius to be identical with Muta, "the mute one", and Dea Tacita, "the silent goddess" — nymphs, minor goddesses, or aspects of a single deity with semantic connections to the Lares and perhaps the Lemures as darker forms of Lares.

== Cult ==
Ovid expounds this myth of Lara and Mercury in the context the festival of Feralia on February 21, and an informal, secretive women's folk-cult at the same festival, invoking Tacita ("the silent goddess"). The rite is led by "an old hag" who holds seven black beans in her mouth; it has similarities to the exorcism of hostile, vagrant spirits at the Lemuria festival, but is completed when a fish-head is sewn up to "bind hostile tongues to silence". Lara/Larunda is also sometimes associated with Acca Larentia whose feast day was the Larentalia on December 23.
