= Mania (deity) =

Ancient Etruscan and Roman goddess of the dead

In ancient Etruscan and Roman mythology, Mania (Etruscan: 𐌌𐌀𐌍𐌉𐌀), also spelled Manea, was a goddess of the dead, spirits and chaos: she was said to be the mother of ghosts, the undead, and other spirits of the night, as well as the Lares and the Manes. She, along with Mantus (Etruscan: 𐌌𐌀𐌍𐌈, romanized: Manth), ruled the underworld.

Mania, along with the Lares, were given offerings to turn their focus so they would not harm the living, leaving the people spared. This event occurred during Saturnalia.

== Etymology ==
Her name links her to the Manes, Mana Genita, and Manius.

Both the Greek and Latin Mania derive from PIE (Proto-Indo-European) *men-, "to think." Cognates include Ancient Greek μένος, ménos, 'mind, thought', and Avestan 𐬎𐬫𐬥𐬌𐬀𐬨, mainyu, 'spirit'.

== See also ==
- Mother of the Lares (Latin: Mater Larum) – Roman chthonic goddess identified with Mania by Varro
- Roman festivals
- Lemuria (festival)
