= Di inferi =

Ancient Roman underworld deities

The di inferi or dii inferi (Latin, "the gods below") were a shadowy collective of ancient Roman deities associated with death and the underworld. The epithet inferi is also given to the mysterious Manes, a collective of ancestral spirits. The most likely origin of the word Manes is from manus or manis (more often in Latin as its antonym immanis), meaning "good" or "kindly," which was a euphemistic way to speak of the inferi so as to avert their potential to harm or cause fear.

== Sacrifices ==
Varro (1st century BC) distinguishes among the di superi ("gods above"), whose sites for offerings are called altaria; the di terrestres ("terrestrial gods"), whose altars are arae; and di inferi, to whom offerings are made by means of foci, "hearths," on the ground or in a pit. In general, animal sacrifice to gods of the upper world usually resulted in communal meals, with the cooked victim apportioned to divine and human recipients. Infernal gods, by contrast, received burnt offerings (holocausts), in which the sacrificial victims were burnt to ash, because the living were prohibited from sharing a meal with the dead. This prohibition is reflected also in funeral rites, where the deceased's passage into the realm of the dead is marked with a holocaust to his Manes at his tomb, while his family returns home to share a sacrificial meal at which his exclusion from the feast was ritually pronounced. Thereafter, he was considered part of the collective Manes, sharing in the sacrifices made to them.

Thus, victims for public sacrifices were most often domesticated animals that were a normal part of the Roman diet, while offerings of victims the Romans considered inedible, such as horses and puppies, mark a chthonic aspect of the deity propitiated, whether the divinity belonged to the underworld entirely. Secret ritual practices characterized as "magic" were often holocausts directed at underworld gods, and puppies were a not uncommon offering, especially to Hecate. Di inferi were often invoked in binding spells (defixiones), which offer personal enemies to them. The infernal gods were also the recipients on the rare occasions when human sacrifice was carried out in Rome. The ritual of devotio, when a general pledged his own life as an offering along with the enemy, was directed at the gods of the underworld under the name Di Manes.

== Festivals and topography ==
Religious sites and rituals for the di inferi were properly outside the pomerium, Rome's sacred boundary, as were tombs. Horse racing along with the propitiation of underworld gods was characteristic of "old and obscure" Roman festivals such as the Consualia, the October Horse, the Taurian Games, and sites in the Campus Martius such as the Tarentum and the Trigarium. The Taurian Games were celebrated specifically to propitiate the di inferi.

The rarely raced three-horse chariot (triga, from which the trigarium, as a generic term for "field for equestrian exercise", took its name) was sacred to the di inferi. According to Isidore of Seville, the three horses represented the three stages of a human life: childhood, youth, and old age.

== Arbores infelices ==
In the Etruscan tradition of tree divination, the di inferi were the tutelaries of certain trees and shrubs, on one list the buckthorn, red cornel, fern, black fig, "those that bear a black berry and black fruit," holly, woodland pear, butcher's broom, briar, and brambles." The wood of these trees, called arbores infelices ("inauspicious trees"), had apotropaic powers and was used for burning objects regarded as ill omens.

== Christian reception ==
The early Christian poet Prudentius regarded the di inferi as integral to the ancestral religion of Rome, and criticized the gladiatorial games held for them as representative of the underworld gods' inhumane and horrifying nature. To Prudentius, the other Roman gods were merely false, easily explained as euhemerized mortals, but an act of devotion to the di inferi constituted devil worship, because Christians assimilated the di inferi to their beliefs pertaining to Hell and the figure variously known as the Devil, Satan, or Lucifer.

== List of underworld or chthonic deities ==
The following list includes deities who were thought to dwell in the underworld, or whose functions mark them as primarily or significantly chthonic or concerned with death. They typically receive nocturnal sacrifices, or dark-colored animals as offerings. Other deities may have had a secondary or disputed chthonic aspect. Rituals pertaining to Mars, particularly in a form influenced by Etruscan tradition, suggest a role in the cycle of birth and death. Mercury moves between the realms of upper- and underworld as a psychopomp. The agricultural god Consus had an altar that was underground, like that of Dis and Proserpina. Deities concerned with birth are often cultivated like death deities, with nocturnal offerings that suggest a theological view of birth and death as a cycle.

The deities listed below are not to be regarded as collectively forming the di inferi, whose individual identities are obscure.

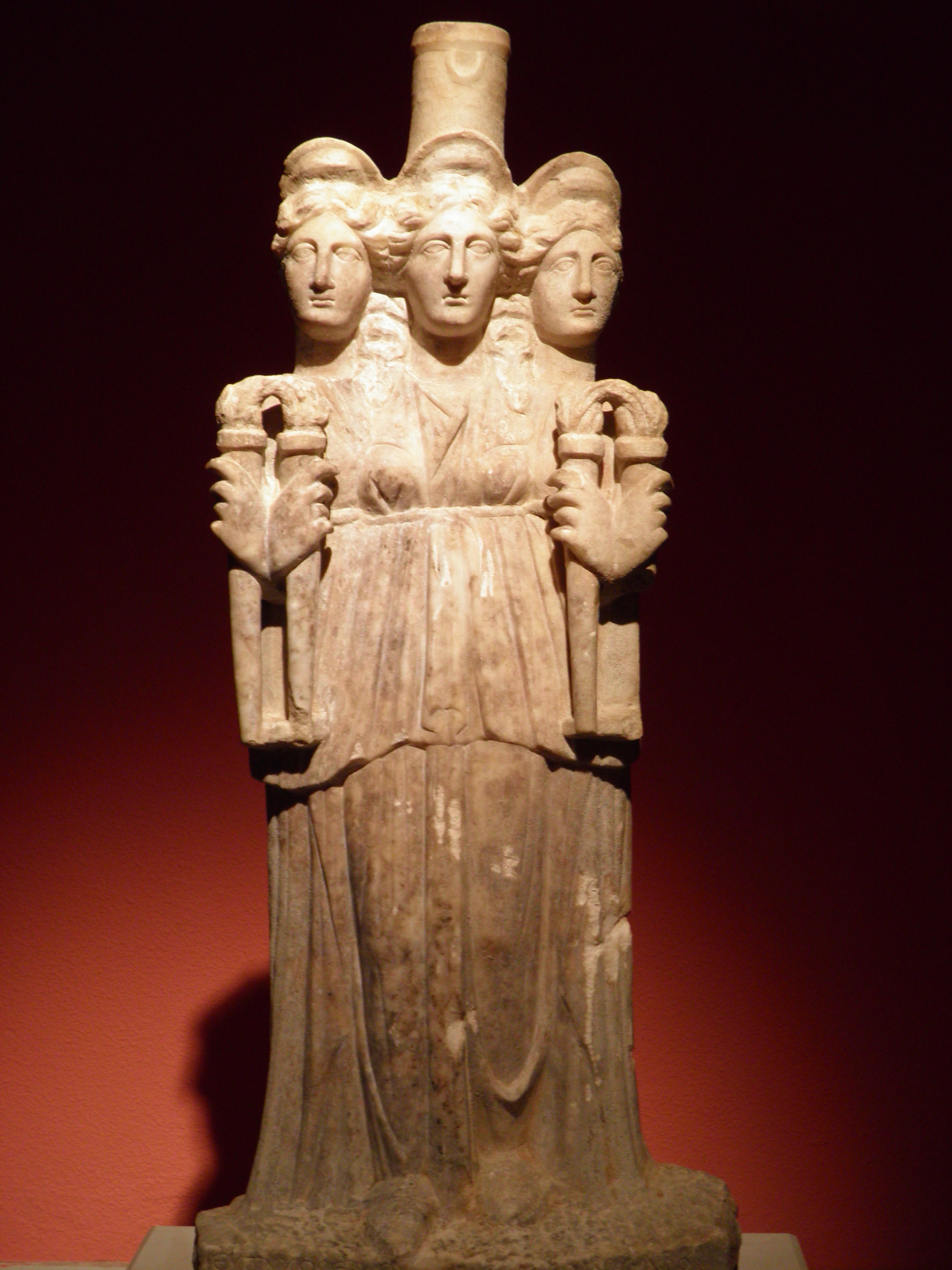
Statue of Hecate; Antalya Museum in Konyaaltı, Turkey

- Dis or Dis pater ("Father Dis"), the Roman equivalent of Greek Plouton, who presided over the afterlife as a divine couple with Proserpina
- Februus, Etruscan god of purification and death, absorbed into the Roman pantheon
- Hecate or Trivia ("three paths"), an aspect of the triple goddess, along with Luna and Proserpina, adapted in Rome
- Lemures, the malevolent dead
- Libitina, one of the indigitamenta associated with death and the underworld
- Manes, spirits of the dead
- Mana Genita, an obscure underworld goddess who was concerned with infant mortality
- Mater Larum ("Mother of the Lares"), a goddess of obscure identity and underworld associations variously identified as Larunda or Dea Tacita ("Silent Goddess") or Muta "(Mute Goddess)"
- Mors, personification of death
- Nenia Dea, goddess of the funeral lament
- Orcus, an archaic underworld deity whose name was also used for the underworld itself; compare Hades
- Parca Maurtia or Morta, one of the three fates who determines mortality
- Proserpina, daughter of Ceres and queen of the underworld with her husband Dis; also Erecura
- Scotus, god of darkness. Greek Erebos; deep, shadow and one of the primordial deities.
- Summanus, god of nocturnal thunder who was later identified with Pluto
- Vediovis, an obscure archaic god, perhaps a chthonic Jove
