= Acca Larentia =

Ancient Roman mythological figure

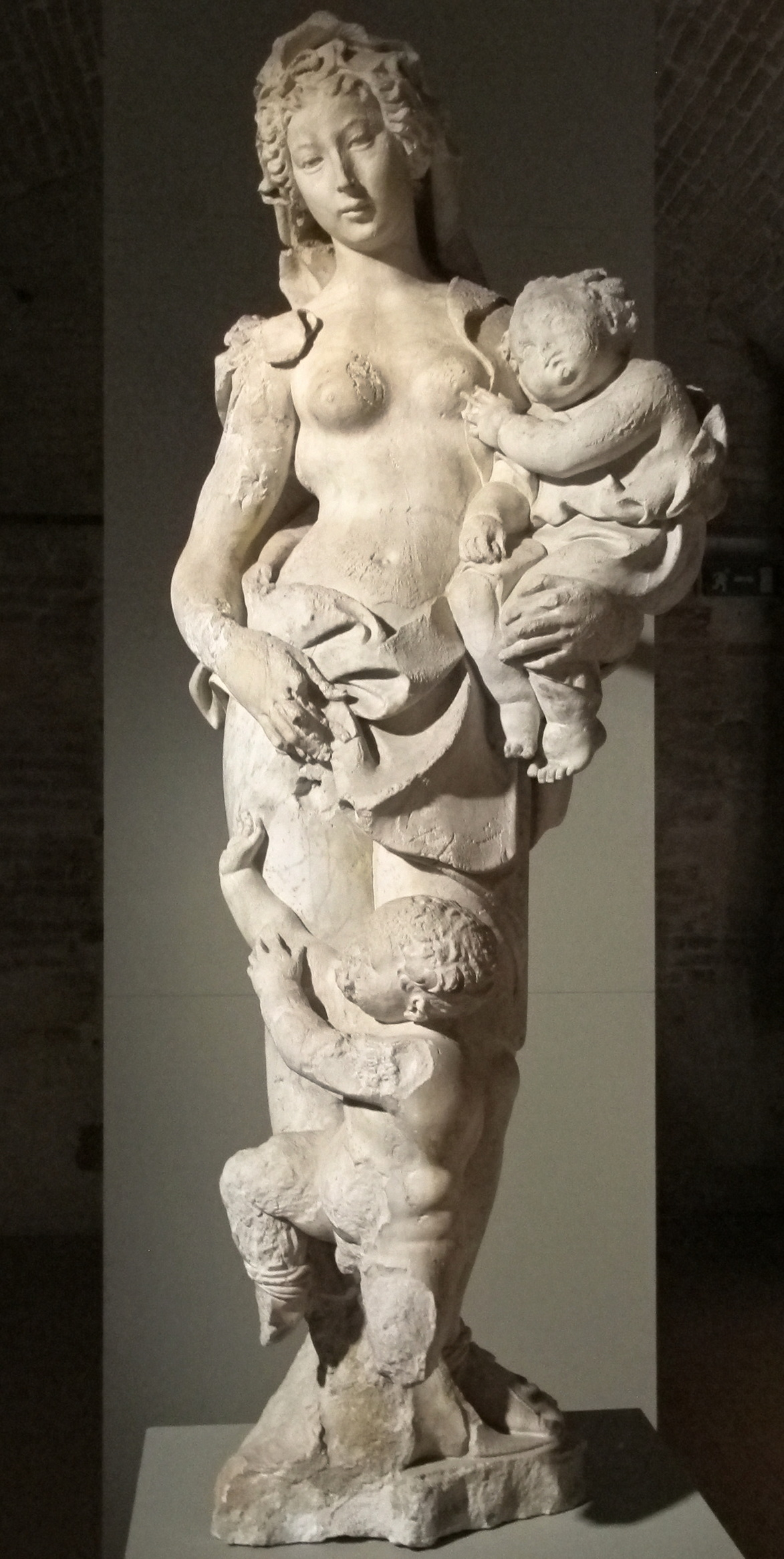
Acca Larentia

Acca Larentia or Acca Larentina was a mythical woman, later a goddess of fertility, in Roman mythology whose festival, the Larentalia, was celebrated on 23 December.

== Myths ==
=== Foster mother ===
In one mythological tradition (that of Licinius Macer, et al.), Acca Larentia was the wife of the shepherd Faustulus. And after Romulus and Remus were thrown into the Tiber river, Faustulus brought them back to his home, where Acca Larentia would raise the children. She had twelve sons, and on the death of one of them Romulus took his place, and with the remaining eleven founded the college of the Arval brothers (Fratres Arvales). She is therefore identified with the Dea Dia of that collegium. The flamen Quirinalis acted in the role of Romulus (deified as Quirinus) to perform funerary rites for his foster mother.

=== Benefactor of Rome ===
Another tradition holds that Larentia was a beautiful prostitute (scortum) of notorious reputation, roughly the same age as Romulus and Remus, during the reign of Ancus Marcius in the 7th century BCE. She was awarded to Hercules as a prize in a game of dice by the guardian of his temple, and locked in it with his other prize, a feast. When the god no longer had need of her, he advised her to marry the first man to proposition her as she stepped out that morning, who turned out to be a wealthy Etruscan named Carutius (or Tarrutius, according to Plutarch). Larentia later inherited all his property and bequeathed it to the Roman people. Ancus, in gratitude for this, allowed her to be buried in the Velabrum, and instituted an annual festival, the Larentalia, at which sacrifices were offered to the Lares. Plutarch explicitly states that this Larentia was a different person from the Larentia who was married to Faustulus, although other writers, such as Licinius Macer, relate their stories as belonging to the same individual.

=== Prostitute ===
Yet another tradition holds that Larentia was neither the wife of Faustulus nor the consort of Hercules, but a courtesan called lupa by the shepherds. Lupa literally means "she-wolf", although the word colloquially meant "prostitute". The legend also states that she left the fortune she amassed through prostitution to the Roman people.

=== Connection to Lares ===
Whatever may be thought of the contradictory accounts of Acca Larentia, it seems clear that she was of Etruscan origin, thus possibly connected with the worship of the Lares. It is entirely possible her name may be derived from Lares. This relation is also apparent in the number of her sons, which corresponds to that of the twelve country Lares. Wiseman explores the connections among Acca Larentia, Lara, and Larunda in several of his books. Acca Larentia has also been associated with another Roman goddess named Dea Dia.

== Functions ==
Like Ceres, Tellus, Flora, and others, Acca Larentia symbolized the fertility of the earth, in particular the city lands and their crops. Acca Larentia is also identified with Larentina, Mana Genita, and Muta.

== In modern literature ==
Acca is a character in David Drake's story "To Bring the Light", a reconstruction of Rome's beginnings around 751 BCE. She is depicted as a sympathetic village woman in the small shepherd community on Palatine Hill from which Rome would begin.
