= Inferi =

Inferi may refer to:

- Inferi, also di inferi or dii inferi, the collective gods of the underworld in ancient Rome
- Inferi, a technical death metal band
- Inferi (Harry Potter), corpses controlled through a Dark wizard's spells in Harry Potter

== See also ==
- Ava Inferi, a Portuguese band
