= Lares =

Guardian deities in ancient Roman religion

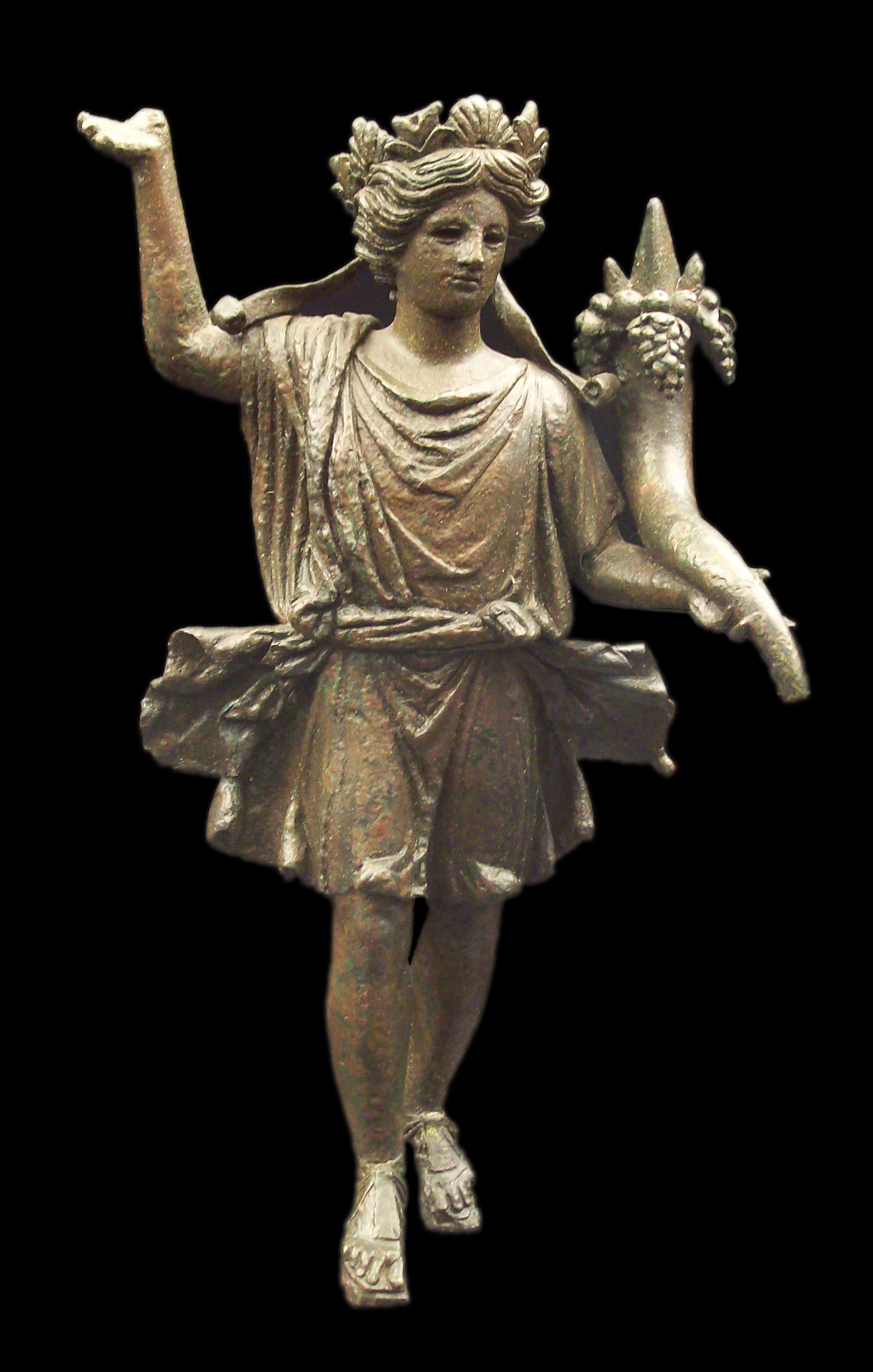
Lar holding a cornucopia from Axatiana (now Lora del Rio) in Roman Spain, early first century AD (National Archaeological Museum of Spain)

Lares (/ˈlɛəriːz, ˈleɪriːz/ LAIR-eez, LAY-reez, Latin: [ˈlareːs]; archaic lasēs, singular lar) were guardian deities in ancient Roman religion. Their origin is uncertain; they may have been hero-ancestors, guardians of the hearth, fields, boundaries, or fruitfulness, or an amalgam of these.

Lares were believed to observe, protect, and influence all that happened within the boundaries of their location or function. The statues of domestic Lares were placed at the table during family meals; their presence, cult, and blessing seem to have been required at all important family events.

Roman writers sometimes identify or conflate them with ancestor-deities, domestic Penates, and the hearth.

Because of these associations, Lares are sometimes categorised as household gods, but some had much broader domains. Roadways, seaways, agriculture, livestock, towns, cities, the state, and its military were all under the protection of their particular Lar or Lares. Those who protected local neighbourhoods (vici) were housed in the crossroad shrines (Compitalia), which served as a focus for the religious, social, and political lives of their local, overwhelmingly plebeian communities. Their cult officials included freedmen and slaves, otherwise excluded by status or property qualifications from most administrative and religious offices.

Compared to Rome's major deities, Lares had limited scope and potency, but archaeological and literary evidence attests to their central role in Roman identity and religious life. By analogy, a homeward-bound Roman could be described as returning ad Larem (to the Lar). Despite official bans on non-Christian cults from the late fourth century AD onwards, unofficial cults to Lares persisted until at least the early fifth century AD.

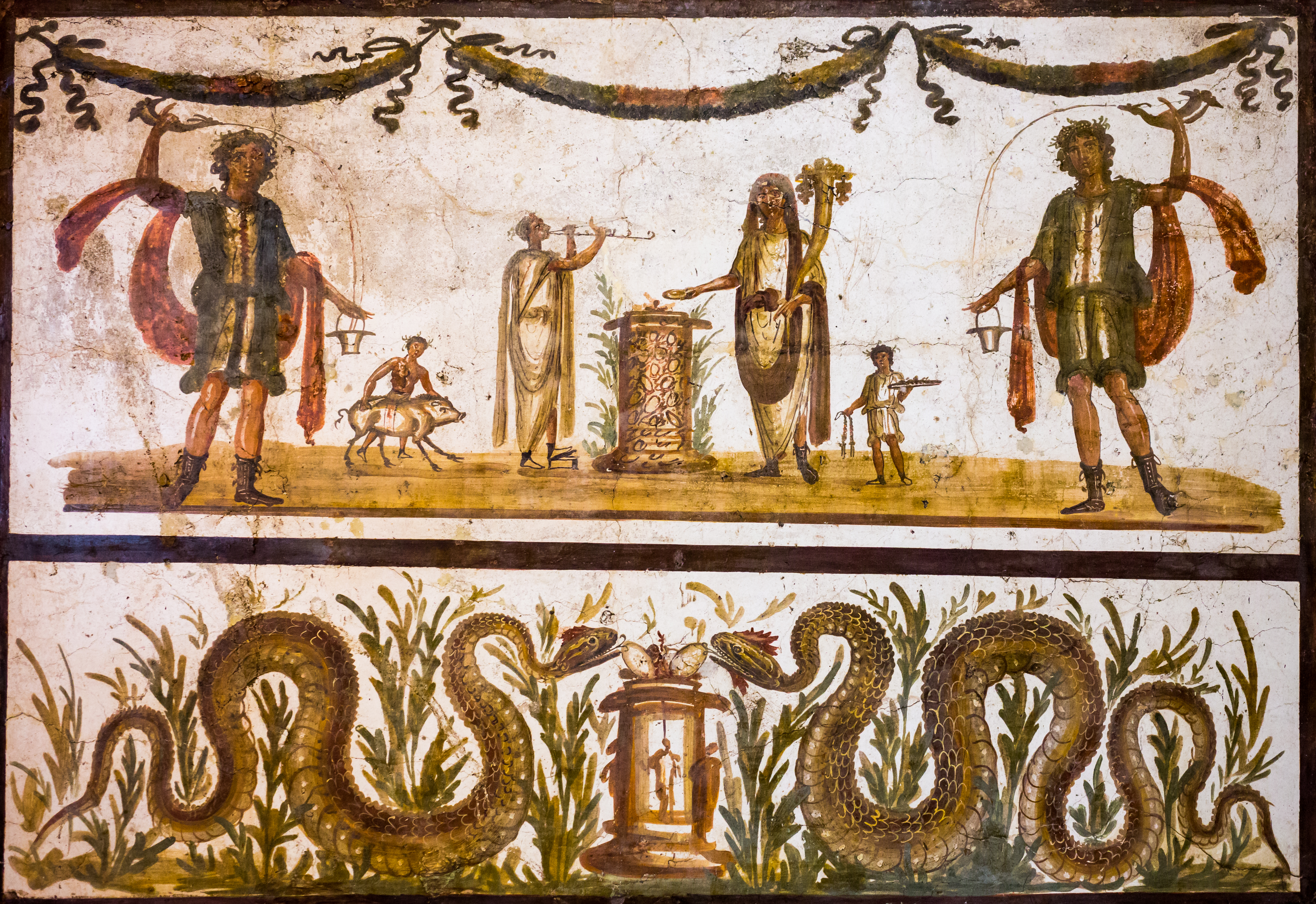
Fresco in Pompeii depicting two lares with rhyton and situla, genius offering at an altar, flute-player, servant with vase and servant pushing a pig to the altar; below: altar with fruits and eggs between two snakes (agathodaimones)

== Origins and development ==
Archaic Rome's Etruscan neighbours practised domestic, ancestral, or family cults very similar to those offered by later Romans to their Lares. The word itself seems to derive from the Etruscan lar, lars, or larth, meaning 'lord'. Ancient Greek and Roman authors offer 'heroes' and 'daimones' as translations of Lares; the early Roman playwright Plautus (circa 254–184 BC) employs a Lar Familiaris as a guardian of treasure on behalf of a family, as a plot equivalent to the Greek playwright Menander's use of a heroon (as an ancestral hero-shrine). Weinstock proposes a more ancient equivalence of Lar and Greek hero, based on his gloss of a fourth-century BC Latin dedication to the Roman ancestor-hero Aeneas as Lare (Lar).

No physical Lar images survive from before the Late Republican era, but literary references (such as Plautus' singular Lar, above) suggest that cult could be offered to a single Lar, and sometimes many more; in the case of the obscure Lares Grundules, perhaps 30. By the early Imperial era, they had become paired divinities, probably through the influences of Greek religion – in particular, the heroic twin Dioscuri – and the iconography of Rome's semidivine founder-twins, Romulus and Remus. Lares are represented as two small, youthful, lively male figures clad in short, rustic, girdled tunics – made of dogskin, according to Plutarch. They take a dancer's attitude, tiptoed or lightly balanced on one leg. One arm raises a drinking horn (rhyton) aloft as if to offer a toast or libation; the other bears a shallow libation dish (patera). Compitalia shrines of the same period show Lares figures of the same type. Painted shrine-images of paired Lares show them in mirrored poses to the left and right of a central figure, understood to be an ancestral genius.

== Their domains ==
Lares belonged within the "bounded physical domain" under their protection, and seem to have been as innumerable as the places they protected. Some appear to have had overlapping functions and changes of name. Some have no particular or descriptive name: for example, those invoked along with Mars in the Carmen Arvale are simply Lases (an archaic form of Lares), whose divine functions must be inferred from the wording and context of the Carmen itself. Likewise, those invoked along with other deities by the consul Publius Decius Mus as an act of devotio before his death in battle are simply Lares. The titles and domains given below cannot, therefore, be taken as exhaustive or definitive.

=== Lares Praestites ===
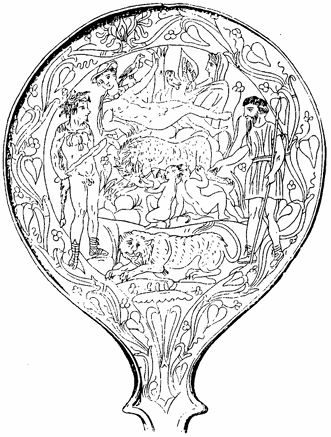
The Praenestine she-wolf mirror.

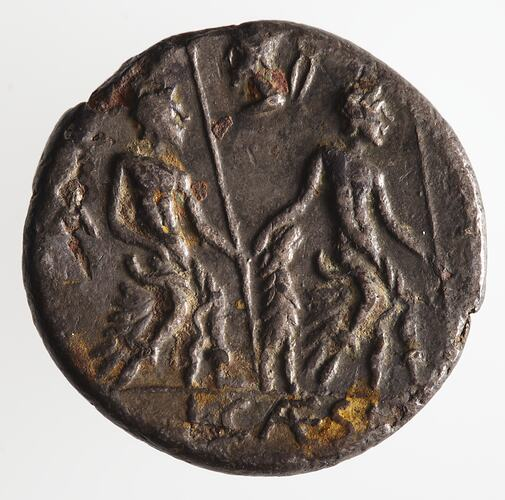
Ancient Roman denarius that—according to Scullard depicts the Lares Praestites.

The Lares Praestites were the Lares of the city of Rome, later of the Roman state or community; literally, the "Lares who stand before", as guardians or watchmen. Ovid, a 1st-century CE Roman poet, in his Fasti, claims that the epithet Praestites was applied to the Lares as they "stand for us, and preside over the city walls, and they are present and bring us aid." According to Festus, a 2nd-century Roman grammarian, the term "Praestites" was a term used by the "ancients" ("antiqui") as a synonym for "antistites" ("overseer, high priest"). It is also possible that the religious concept of the Lares Praestites may connect to the Umbrian goddess Prestota, whose name is mentioned in the Iguvine tablets. Etymologically, the linguist Benjamin W. Fortson IV suggests Umbrian Prestota and Latin Praestita may reflect an earlier pre-form of the shape *Praistatā ("protectress").

Ovid may imply that the Lares Praestites were of Sabine origin, although the exact meaning of the passage is obscure due to the corruption of the manuscript tradition. The current Loeb Classical Library edition of the Fasti, which was translated by James G. Frazer in 1931, renders the sentence in question as "voverat illa quidem Curius," which it renders as "Curius indeed had vowed them." However, the classicist Harriet I. Flower suggests that the text may reference the Sabine town of Cures. The 1st-century BCE Roman author Varro claims that the Lares—along with numerous other deities—were "dedicated" at Rome ("voto sunt Romae dedicatae") by Titus Tatius, a legendary king of the Sabines. Moreover, the Greek author Strabo claims that Titus Tatius and Numa Pompilius both originated from the city of Cures.

Ovid also describes a story in which the naiad Lara, after being raped by Mercury, becomes mother to the Lares. The classicist T. P. Wiseman connects this legend to a scene on a Praenestine mirror that depicts two infants suckling the breasts of a she-wolf. Wiseman interprets this scene as a representation of the story of the foundation of Rome, though he does not consider the twins to equate to Romulus and Remus, as—according to Wiseman—the assumption that the mirror portrays the standard version of the myth creates issues with the identification of the other figures in the artwork. Instead, Wiseman suggests that the mirror portrays Hermes and Tacita—who was identified by Ovid with Lara—and that the children are the Lares Praestites. Wiseman's interpretation is not universally accepted, with the classicist Ana Mayorgas Rodriguez stating that "although the surrounding figures cannot be recognised certainly, it is still most probable that the children are Romulus and Remus." According to the classicist Tim Cornell, a possible connection between the Lares Praestites and the founding of Rome may itself relate to a potential characterization of the Lares as "deified ancestors." Wisseman further argues that the possible presence of the Lares Praestites on this mirror could indicate that the standard story of Romulus and Remus did not exist by 340 BCE—around the date of the creation of the mirror. However, the classicist Fay Glinister criticizes this argument, stating that it relies upon ignorance of "early iconographic evidence."

The Lares Praestites were housed in the state Regia, near the temple of Vesta, with whose worship and sacred hearth they were associated; they seem to have protected Rome from malicious or destructive fire. They may have also functioned as the neighbourhood Lares of Octavian (the later emperor Augustus), who owned a house between the Temple of Vesta and the Regia. Augustus later gave this house and care of its Lares to the Vestals: this donation reinforced the religious bonds between the Lares of his household, his neighbourhood, and the State. His Compitalia reforms extended this identification to every neighbourhood Lares shrine. However, Lares Praestites and the Lares Compitales (renamed Lares Augusti) should probably not be considered identical. Their local festivals were held at the same Compitalia shrines, but at different times.

Ovid mentions an altar to the Lares Praestites that was built during the Kalends of May. According to Ovid, this altar had decayed due to the wears of time, which may—according to classicist Howard Scullard—indicate waning interest in the Lares Praestites. Ovid also mentions a carved-out statue of a dog placed by this same altar. Similarly, Plutarch, a 1st-century Greek author, mentions that a dog is placed by a statue of the Lares Praestites, who are themselves supposedly adorned in dog skins. Despite the literary connection of dogs with the Lares Praestites, there is little known material evidence corroborating this relationship. It is perhaps possible that such imagery may feature on a denarius dated to around 112-111 BCE that showcases two seated Lares as young men armed with spears placed by a dog. For unclear reasons, there seemingly exists a depiction of the god Vulcan upon this coin alongside the image of the Lares Praestites, though it may indicate a connection between the two mythological entities. According to Flower, the image depicted upon this coin may equate to the aforementioned shrine described by Ovid. Still, Flower considers the exact location of the site to be "hypothetical" as it has not been confirmed through archaeological excavation. Further evidence may derive from a statue depicting a Lare dated to around 100 BCE that is currently stored in the Louvre. According to the classical scholar Alexandra Sofronview, the design of the tunic of this Lare is unusual and it may stylistically portray a garment fashioned from dog-skin.

Ovid explains the canine associations as the result of numerous supposed parallels between dogs and the Lares. According to Ovid, both dogs and the Lares Praestites guard the house, are loyal to their master, are wakeful ("pervigilant"), and chase thieves. Additionally, Ovid notes that crossroads are "dear" to dogs and to the Lares, which may reference the Lares Compitales. Alternatively, the classicist Eli Edward Buriss suggests a relationship between the dogs of the Lares Praestites and the general connection between dogs and witches or deities such as Hecate. Likewise, the classicist Margaret Waites proposed that the imagery of dogs indicated that the Lares Praestites possessed chthonic characteristics. In support of this theory, Waites similarly cites the association between chthonic beings such as Hecate and dogs in other areas of Graeco-Roman religion. Plutarch does not provide a definitive explanation for this practice, although he suggests that the custom may have emerged because "it is fitting that those who stand before a house" to—like some dogs—be "terrifying to strangers, but gentle and mild to the inmates." Another possibility, also mentioned by Plutarch, maintains that the Lares Praestites were closely associated with dogs due to a belief that the animals were effective in tracking "evil-doers." Plutarch himself notes that this proposal is partially reliant upon a belief that the Lares could function as delivers of divine justice, in a manner similar to the Furies. Another theory, advanced by the classicist Christopher A. Faraone, relates the canine symbolism to Assyrian guardian statues.

=== Others ===
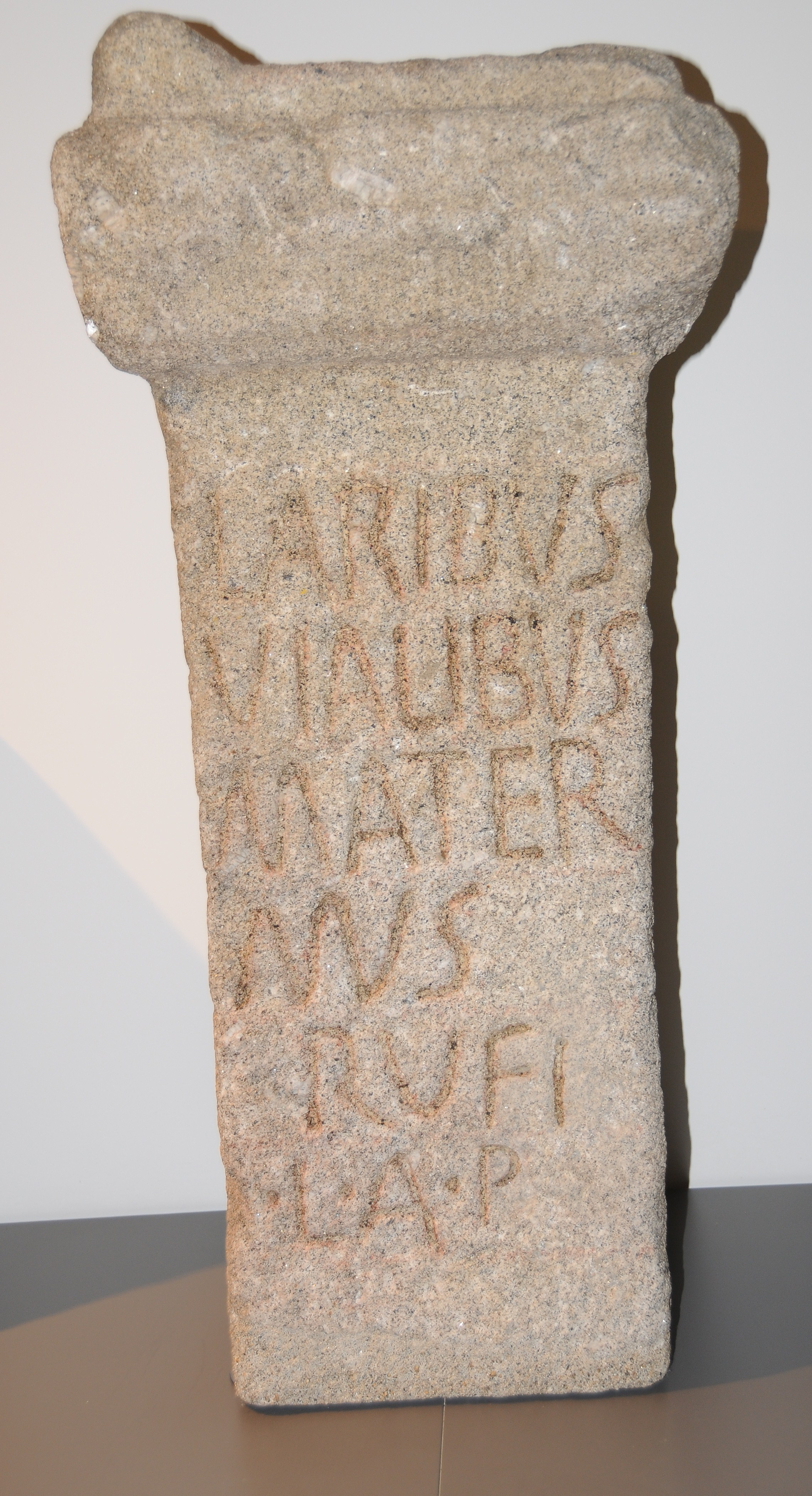
- Inscription to the Lares Viales, the Lares of the roads
  Lares Augusti: the Lares of Augustus, or perhaps "the august Lares", given public cult on the first of August, thereby identified with the inaugural day of Imperial Roman magistracies and with Augustus himself. Official cult to the Lares Augusti continued from their institution through to the 4th century AD. They are identified with the Lares Compitalicii and Lares Praestites of Augustan religious reform.
- Lares Compitalicii (also Lares Compitales): the Lares of local communities or neighbourhoods (vici), celebrated at the Compitalia festival. Their shrines were usually positioned at main central crossroads (compites) of their vici, and provided a focus for the religious and social life of their communities, particularly for the plebeian and servile masses. The Lares Compitalicii are synonymous with the Lares Augusti of Augustan reform. Augustus' institution of cult to the Lares Praestites was held at the same Compitalia shrines, but on a different date.
- Lares Domestici: Lares of the house, they were probably identical with Lares Familiares.
- Lares Familiares: Lares of the family, probably identical with the Lares Domestici
- Lares Grundules: the 30 "grunting Lares" or Lares of the eaves, supposedly were given an altar and cult by Romulus or Aeneas when a sow produced a prodigious farrow of 30 piglets. According to Dionysius of Halicarnassus, the place where the sow bore the piglets and Aeneas made the sacrifice was sacred, and forbidden to foreigners. The sow's body was said to be kept at Lavinium, preserved in salt brine as a sacred object. The 30 piglets would provide the theological justification for the 30 populi Albenses of the feriae Latinae (the 30 fortified boroughs supposedly founded by Aeneas at Lavinium), and the 30 curiae of Rome.
- Lar Militaris: "military Lar", named by Marcianus Capella as member of two distinct cult groupings which include Mars, Jupiter, and other major Roman deities. The classicist Robert E. A. Palmer interprets the figure from a probable altar-relief as "something like a Lar Militaris": he is cloaked, and sits horseback on a saddle of panther skin.
- Lares Patrii: Lares "of the fathers" possibly are equivalent to the dii patrii (deified ancestors) who received cult at Parentalia.
- Lares Permarini: These Lares protected seafarers; also a temple was dedicated to them (of which one is known at Rome's Campus martius).
- Lares Privati
- Lares Rurales: Lares of the fields, identified as custodes agri – guardians of the fields – by Tibullus
- Lares Viales: Lares of roads (viae, singular via) and those who travel them

== Domestic Lares ==
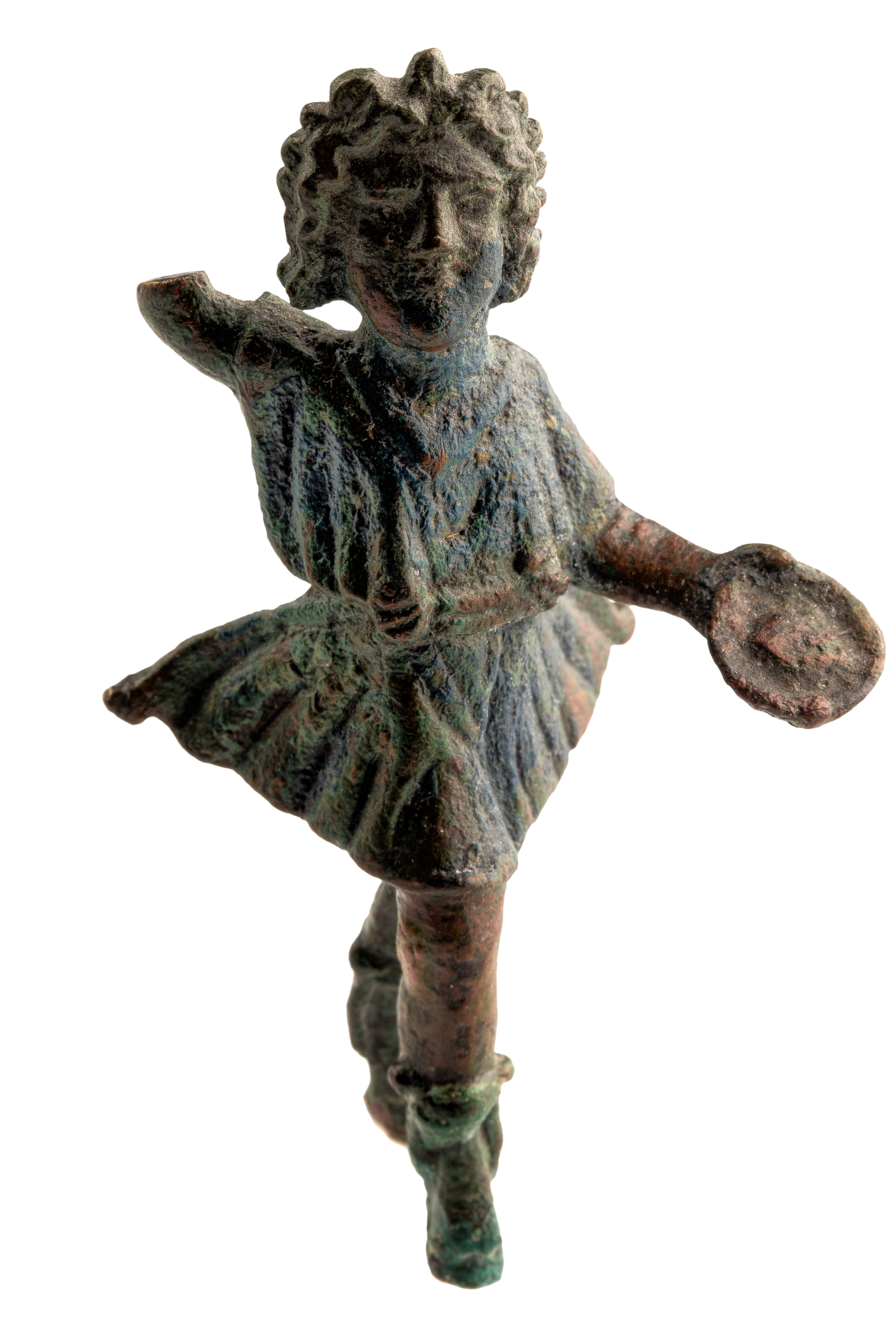
Figurine of a Lar, 1 B.C.–200 A.D., ca 7.7 cm tall Gallo-Roman Museum, Tongeren

Traditional Roman households owned at least one protective Lares-figure, housed in a shrine along with the images of the household's penates, genius image and any other favoured deities. Their statues were placed at table during family meals and banquets. They were divine witnesses at important family occasions, such as marriages, births, and adoptions, and their shrines provided a religious hub for social and family life. Individuals who failed to attend to the needs of their Lares and their families should expect neither reward nor good fortune for themselves. In Plautus' comedy Aulularia, the Lar of the miserly paterfamilias Euclio reveals a pot of gold long-hidden beneath his household hearth, denied to Euclio's father because of his stinginess towards his Lar. Euclio's own stinginess deprives him of the gold until he sees the error of his ways; then, he uses it to give his virtuous daughter the dowry she deserves, and all is well.

Responsibility for household cult and the behaviour of family members ultimately fell to the family head, the paterfamilias, but he could, and indeed should on certain occasions properly delegate the cult and care of his Lares to other family members, especially his servants. The positioning of the Lares at the House of Menander suggest that the paterfamilias delegated this religious task to his villicus (bailiff).

Care and cult attendance to domestic Lares could include offerings of spelt wheat and grain-garlands, honey cakes and honeycombs, grapes and first fruits, wine, and incense. They could be served at any time and not always by intention; in addition to the formal offerings that seem to have been their due, any food that fell to the floor during house banquets was theirs. On important occasions, wealthier households may have offered their own Lares a pig. A single source describes Romulus' provision of an altar and sacrifice to Lares Grundules ('grunting lares') after an unusually large farrowing of 30 piglets. The circumstances of this offering are otherwise unknown, Taylor conjectures the sacrifice of a pig, possibly a pregnant sow.

=== Lararia ===
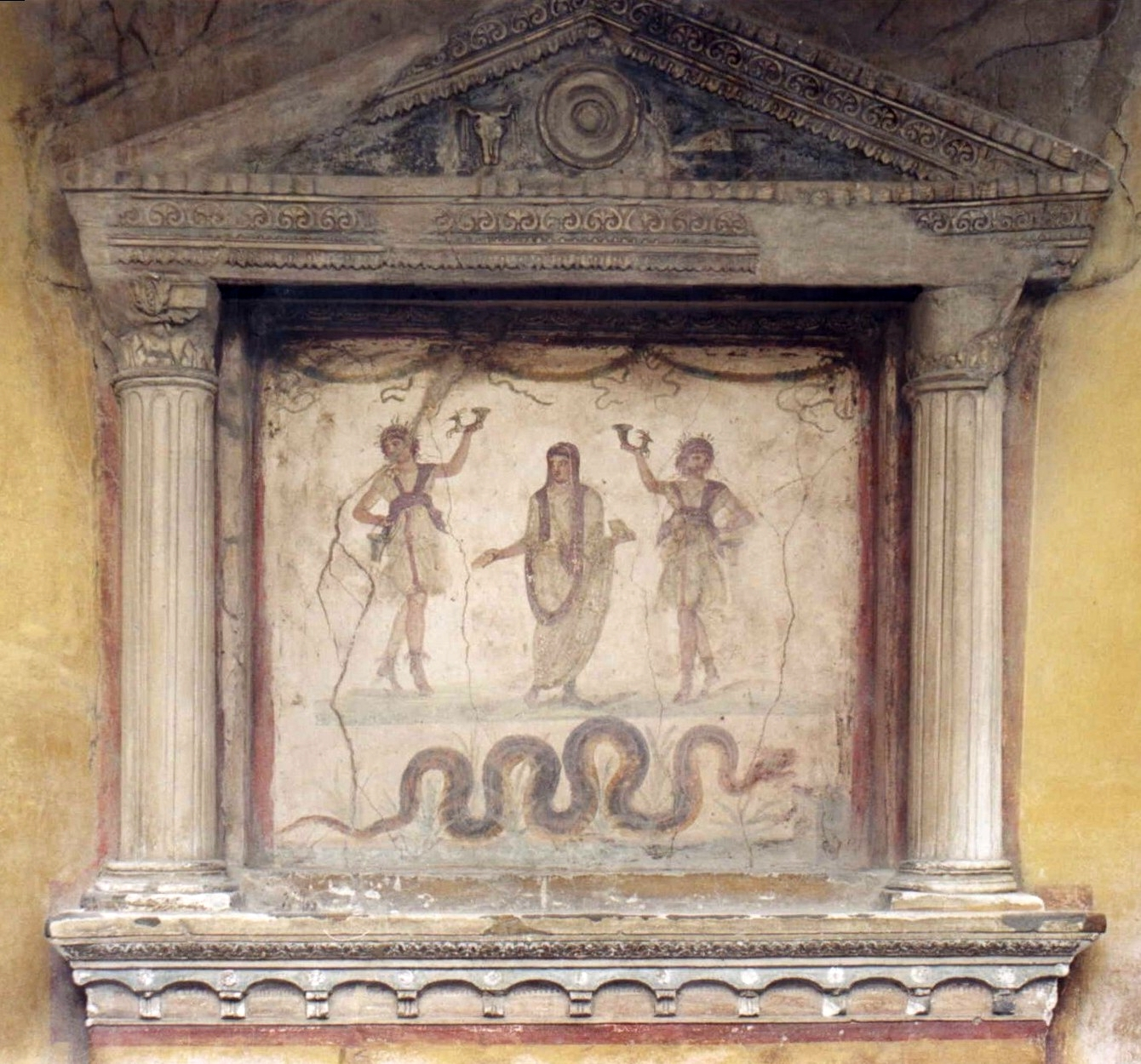
Lararium with painted figures at the House of the Vettii, Pompeii: Two Lares, each holding a rhyton, flank an ancestor-genius holding a libation bowl and incense box, his head covered as if for sacrifice. The snake, associated with the land's fertility and thus prosperity, approaches a low, laden altar. The shrine's tympanum shows a patera, ox-skull and sacrificial knife.

By the early Imperial period, household shrines of any kind were known generically as lararia (s. lararium) because they typically contained a Lares figure or two. Painted lararia from Pompeii show two Lares flanking a genius or ancestor-figure, who wears his toga in the priestly manner prescribed for sacrificers. Underneath this trio, a serpent, representing the fertility of fields or the principle of generative power, winds towards an altar. The essentials of sacrifice are depicted around and about; bowl and knife, incense box, libation vessels and parts of sacrificial animals.

In households of modest means, small Lar statuettes were set in wall-niches, sometimes merely a tile-support projecting from a painted background. In wealthier households, they tend to be found in servant's quarters and working areas. At Pompeii, the Lares and lararium of the sophisticated, unpretentious and artistically restrained House of Menander were associated with its servant quarters and adjacent agricultural estate. Its statuary was unsophisticated, "rustic" and probably of ancient type or make. The placing of Lares in the public or semi-public parts of a house, such as its atrium, enrolled them in the more outward, theatrical functions of household religion.

The House of the Vettii in Pompeii had two lararia; one was positioned out of public view, and was probably used in private household rites. The other was placed boldly front-of-house, among a riot of Greek-inspired mythological wall-paintings and the assorted statuary of patron divinities. Its positioning in a relatively public part of the domus would have provided a backdrop for the probably interminable salutatio (formal greeting) between its upwardly mobile owners and their strings of clients and "an assorted group of unattached persons who made the rounds of salutationes to assure their political and economic security".

Domestic Lararia were also used as a sacred, protective depository for commonplace symbols of family change and continuity. In his coming-of-age, a boy gave his personal amulet (bulla) to his Lares before he put on his manly toga (toga virilis). Once his first beard had been ritually cut off, it was placed in their keeping. On the night before her wedding, a Roman girl surrendered her dolls, soft balls, and breastbands to her family Lares, as a sign she had come of age. On the day of her marriage, she transferred her allegiance to her husband's neighbourhood Lares (Lares Compitalici) by paying them a copper coin en route to her new home. She paid another to her new domestic Lares, and one to her husband. If the marriage made her a materfamilias, she took joint responsibility with her husband for aspects of household cult.

== Compitalia ==
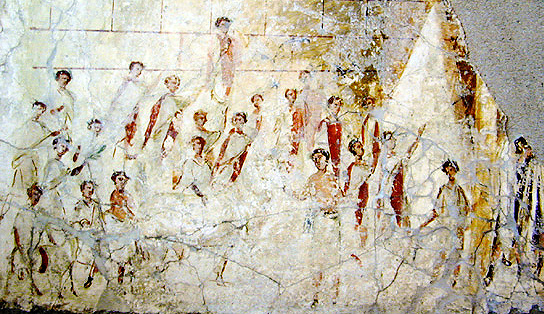
A fresco from a building near Pompeii, a rare depiction of Roman men in togae praetextae with dark red borders. It dates from the early Imperial Era and probably shows an event during Compitalia

The city of Rome was protected by a Lar, or Lares, housed in a shrine (sacellum) on the city's ancient, sacred boundary (pomerium). Each Roman vicus (pl. vici – administrative districts or wards) had its own communal Lares, housed in a permanent shrine at a central crossroads of the district. These Lares Compitalicii were celebrated at the Compitalia festival (from the Latin compitum, a crossroad) just after the Saturnalia that closed the old year. In the "solemn and sumptuous" rites of Compitalia, a pig was led in celebratory procession through the streets of the vicus, then sacrificed to the Lares at their Compitalia shrine. Cult offerings to these Lares were much the same as those to domestic Lares; in the late Republican era, Dionysius of Halicarnassus describes the contribution of a honey-cake from each household as ancient tradition. The Compitalia itself was explained as an invention of Rome's sixth king, Servius Tullius, whose servile origins and favour towards plebeians and slaves had antagonised Rome's ruling Patrician caste and ultimately caused his downfall; he was said to have been fathered by a Lar or some other divine being, on a royal slave-girl. So although the Lares Compitalicii were held to protect all the community, regardless of social class, their festival had a distinctly plebeian ambiance, and a measure of Saturnalia's reversal of the status quo. Tradition required that the Lares Compitalicii be served by men of very low legal and social status, not merely plebeians, but freedmen and slaves, to whom "even the heavy-handed Cato recommended liberality during the festival". Dionysius' explains it thus:

... the heroes [Lares] looked kindly on the service of slaves. And [the Romans] still observe the ancient custom in connection with those sacrifices propitiating the heroes by the ministry of their servants and during these days removing every badge of their servitude, in order that the slaves, being softened by this instance of humanity, which has something great and solemn about it, may make themselves more agreeable to their masters and be less sensible of the severity of their condition.

While the supervision of the vici and their religious affairs may have been charged to the Roman elite who occupied most magistracies and priesthoods, management of the day-to-day affairs and public amenities of neighbourhoods – including their religious festivals – was the responsibility of freedmen and their slave-assistants. The Compitalia was an official festival but during the Republican era, its shrines appear to have been funded locally, probably by subscription among the plebeians, freedmen and slaves of the vici. Their support through private benefaction is nowhere attested, and official attitudes to the Republican Compitalia seem equivocal at best: The Compitalia games (Ludi Compitalicii) included popular theatrical religious performances of raucously subversive flavour: Compitalia thus offered a religiously sanctioned outlet for free speech and populist subversion. At some time between 85 and 82 BC, the Compitalia shrines were the focus of cult to the ill-fated popularist politician Marcus Marius Gratidianus during his praetorship. What happened – if anything – to the Compitalia festivals and games in the immediate aftermath of his public, ritualised murder by his opponents is not known but in 68 BC the games at least were suppressed as "disorderly".

=== Augustan religious reforms ===
As princeps, Augustus reformed Compitalia and subdivided the vici. From 7 BC a Lares' festival on 1 May was dedicated to the Lares Augusti and a new celebration of the Genius Augusti was held on 1 August, the inaugural day for Roman magistracies and personally auspicious for Augustus as the anniversary of his victory at Actium. Statues representing the Genius Augusti were inserted between the Lares of the Compitalia shrines. Whether or not Augustus replaced the public Lares with "his own" household Lares is questionable – the earliest reference to august Lares (58 BC, in provincial Cisalpine Gaul) anticipates Octavian's adoption of Augustus as honorific by some thirty years – but when coupled with his new cult to the Genius Augusti, his donation of Lares Augusti statues for use at Compitalia shrines, and his association with the community Lares through the shared honorific makes the reformed Compitalia an unmistakable, local, "street-level" aspect of cult to living emperors.

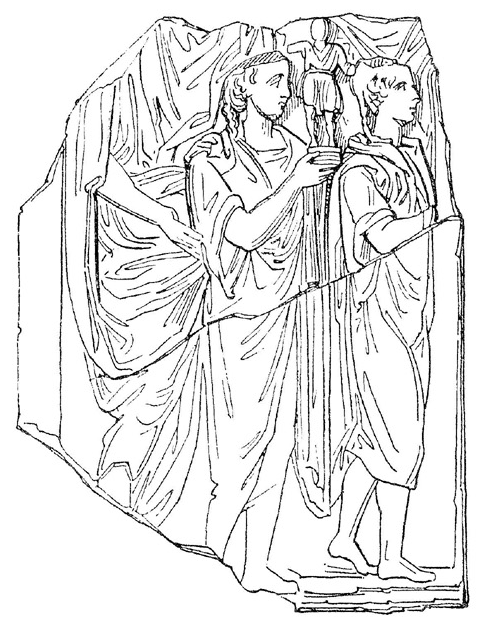
Compitalia; the image of a Lar is carried in procession. Drawing from a fragment of bas-relief in the former Lateran Museum

The iconography of these shrines celebrates their sponsor's personal qualities and achievements and evokes a real or re-invented continuity of practice from ancient times. Some examples are sophisticated, others crude and virtually rustic in style; taken as a whole, their positioning in every vicus (ward) of Rome symbolically extends the ideology of a "refounded" Rome to every part of the city. The Compitalia reforms were ingenious and genuinely popular; they valued the traditions of the Roman masses and won their political, social and religious support. Probably in response to this, provincial cults to the Lares Augusti appear soon afterwards; in Ostia, a Lares Augusti shrine was placed in the forum, which was ritually cleansed for the occasion. The Augustan model persisted until the end of the Western Empire, with only minor and local modifications, and the Lares Augusti would always be identified with the ruling emperor, the Augustus, whatever his personal or family name.

Augustus officially confirmed the plebeian-servile character of Compitalia as essential to his "restoration" of Roman tradition, and formalised their offices; the vici and their religious affairs were now the responsibility of official magistri vici, usually freedmen, assisted by ministri vici who were usually slaves. A dedication of 2 BC to the Augustan Lares lists four slaves as shrine-officials of their vicus. Given their slave status, their powers are debatable but they clearly constitute an official body. Their inscribed names, and those of their owners, are contained within an oak-wreath cartouche. The oak-leaf chaplet was voted to Augustus as "saviour" of Rome; He was symbolic pater ('father') of the Roman state, and though his genius was owed cult by his extended family, its offer seems to have been entirely voluntary. Hardly any of the reformed Compital shrines show evidence of cult to the emperor's genius. Augustus acted with the political acumen of any responsible patronus ('patron'); his subdivision of the vici created new opportunities for his clients. It repaid honour with honours, which for the plebs meant offices, priesthood, and the respect of their peers; at least for some. In Petronius' Satyricon, a magistrate's lictor bangs on Trimalchio's door; it causes a fearful stir but in comes Habinnas, one of Augustus' new priests, a stonemason by trade; dressed up in his regalia, perfumed and completely drunk.

== Origin myths and theology ==
From the Late Republican and early Imperial eras, the priestly records of the Arval Brethren and the speculative commentaries of a very small number of literate Romans attest to a Mother of the Lares (Mater Larum). Her children are invoked by the obscure, fragmentary opening to the Arval Hymn (Carmen Arvale); enos Lases iuvate ('Help us, Lares'). She is named as Mania by Varro (116–27 BC), who believes her an originally Sabine deity. The same name is used by later Roman authors with the general sense of a bogey or "evil spirit". Much later, Macrobius (fl. AD 395–430) describes the woolen figurines hung at crossroad shrines during Compitalia as maniae, supposed as an ingenious substitution for child sacrifices to the Mater Larum, instituted by Rome's last monarch and suppressed by its first consul, L. Junius Brutus. Modern scholarship takes the Arval rites to the Mother of the Lares as typically chthonic, and the goddess herself as a dark or terrible aspect of the earth-mother, Tellus. Ovid supplies or elaborates an origin-myth for the Mater Larum as a once-loquacious nymph, Lara, whose tongue is cut out as punishment for her betrayal of Jupiter's secret amours. Lara thus becomes Muta (the speechless one). Mercury leads her to the underworld abode of the dead (ad Manes); in this place of silence she is Dea Tacita ('the silent one'). En route, he impregnates her. She gives birth to twin boys as silent or speechless as she. In this context, the Lares can be understood as "manes of silence" (taciti manes).

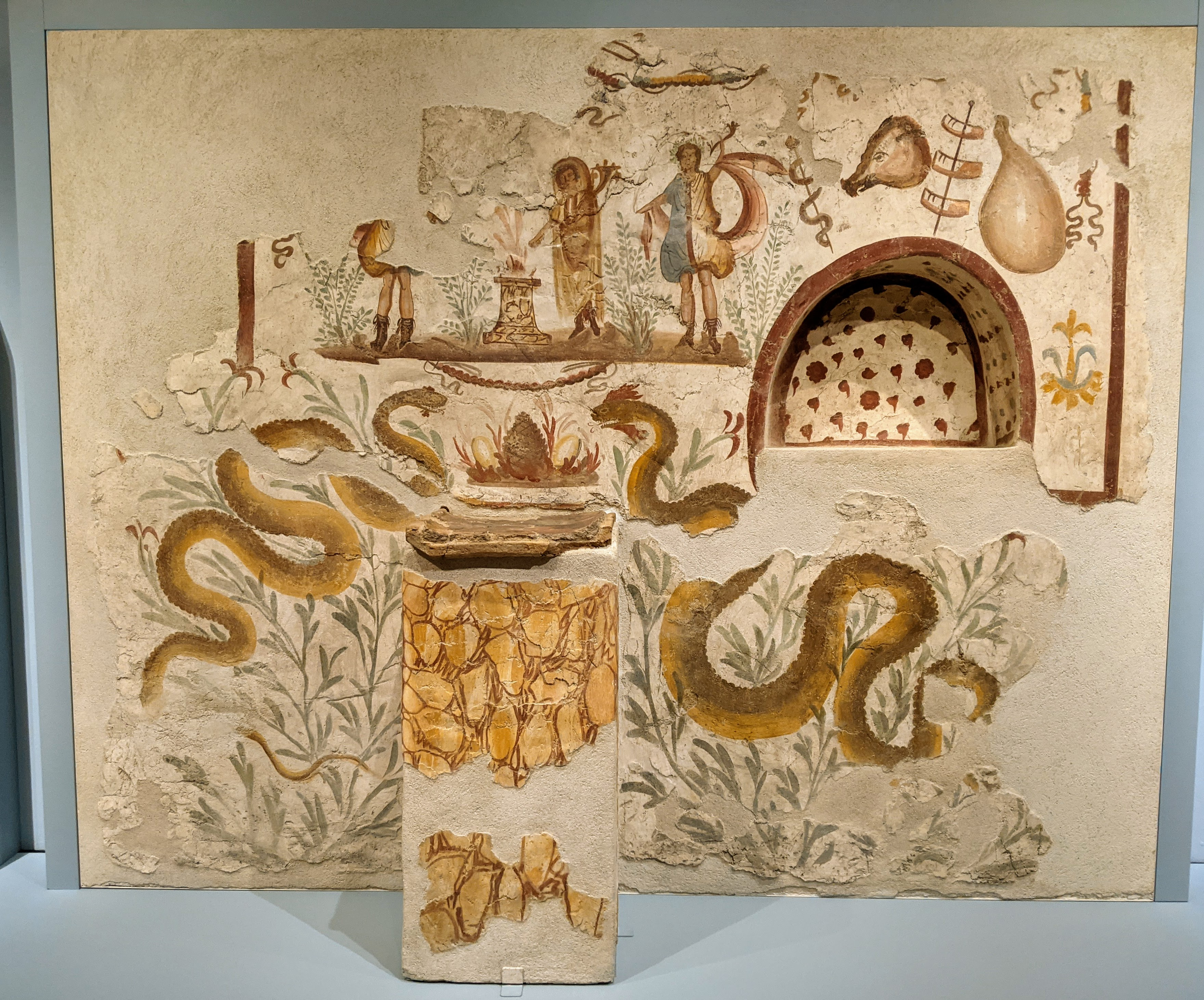
Household lararium in Pompeii

Ovid's poetic myth appears to draw on remnants of ancient rites to the Mater Larum, surviving as folk-cult among women at the fringes of the Feralia: an old woman sews up a fish-head, smears it with pitch then pierces and roasts it to bind hostile tongues to silence: she thus invokes Dea Tacita. If, as Ovid proposes, the lemures are an unsatiated, malevolent and wandering form of Lares, then they and their mother also find their way into Lemuralia, when the hungry Lemures gather in Roman houses and claim cult from the living. The paterfamilias must redeem himself and his family with the offer of midnight libations of spring-water, and black beans spat onto the floor. Any lemures dissatisfied with these offerings are scared away by the loud clashing of bronze pots. Taylor notes the chthonic character of offerings made to fall – or deliberately expelled – towards the earth. If their mother's nature connects the Lares to the earth they are, according to Taylor, spirits of the departed.

Plutarch offers a legend of Servius Tullius, sixth king of Rome, credited with the founding of the Lares' public festival, Compitalia. Servius' virginal slave mother-to-be is impregnated by a phallus-apparition arising from the hearth, or some other divine being held to be a major deity or ancestor-hero by some, a Lar by others: the latter seems to have been a strong popular tradition. During the Augustan era, Dionysius of Halicarnassus reports Servius' fathering by a Lar and his pious founding of Compitalia as common knowledge, and the Lar as equivalent to the Greek hero; semi-divine, ancestral and protective of place.

These stories connect the Lar to the hearth, the underworld, generative powers (however embodied), nourishment, forms of divine or semi-divine ancestry and the coupling of the divine with the servile, wherein those deprived by legal or birth-status of a personal gens could serve, and be served by, the cults attached to Compitalia and Larentalia. Mommsen's contention that Lares were originally field deities is not incompatible with their role as ancestors and guardians. A rural familia relied on the productivity of their estate and its soil: around the early 2nd century BC, Plautus's Lar Familiaris protects the house, and familia as he has always done, and safeguards their secrets.

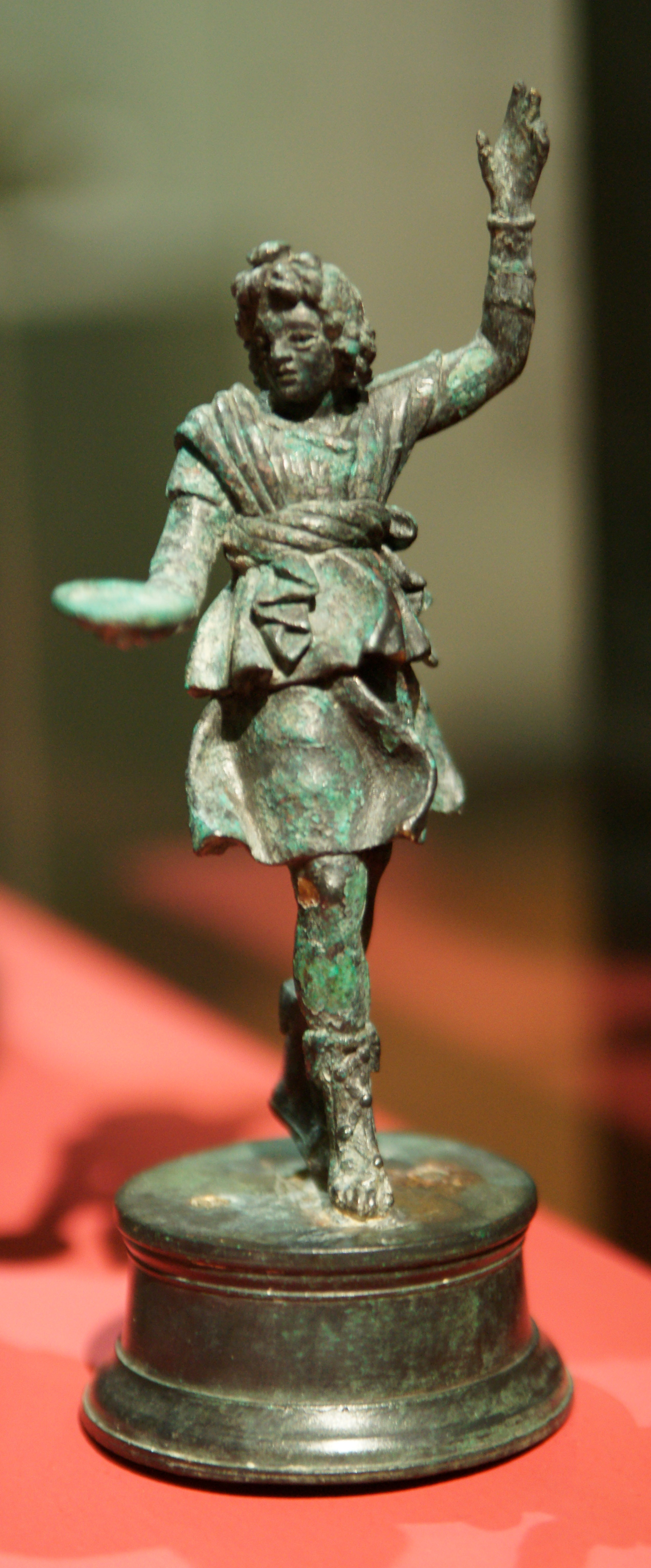
Gallo-Roman Lar from the Muri collection, Imperial period (Historical Museum of Bern)

The little mythography that belongs to the Lares seems inventive and poetic. With no traditional, systematic theology to limit their development, Lares became a single but usefully nebulous type, with many functions. In Cicero's day, one's possession of domestic Lares laid moral claim of ownership and belonging to one's domicile. Festus identifies them as "gods of the underworld" (di inferi). To Flaccus, they are ancestral genii (s. genius). Apuleius considers them benevolent ancestral spirits; they belong both to the underworld and to particular places of the human world. To him, this distinguishes them from the divine and eternal genius which inhabits, protects and inspires living men: and having specific physical domains, they cannot be connected with the malicious, vagrant lemures. In the 4th century AD the Christian polemicist Arnobius, claiming among others Varro (116–27 BC) as his source, describes them as once-human spirits of the underworld, therefore ancestral manes-ghosts; but also as "gods of the air", or the upper world. He also – perhaps uniquely in the literature but still claiming Varro's authority – categorises them with the frightful larvae. The ubiquity of Lares seems to have offered considerable restraints on Christian participation in Roman public life. In the 3rd century AD, Tertullian remarks the inevitable presence of Lares in pagan households as good reason to forbid marriage between pagan men and Christian women: the latter would be "tormented by the vapor of incense each time the demons are honored, each solemn festivity in honor of the emperors, each beginning of the year, each beginning of the month." Yet their type proved remarkably persistent. In the early 5th century AD, after the official suppression of non-Christian cults, Rutilius Namatianus could write of a famine-stricken district whose inhabitants had no choice but to "abandon their Lares" (thus, to desert their rat-infested houses).

== See also ==
- Eudaemon (mythology)
- Imperial cult (ancient Rome)
- Spirit house
- Turan, the Etruscan love goddess
