= Dea Tacita =

Goddess in Roman mythology

In Roman mythology, Dea Tacita ("the silent goddess") also known as Dea Muta or Muta Tacita, was a goddess of the dead. Ovid's poem Fasti includes a passage describing a rite propitiating Dea Tacita in order to "seal up hostile mouths / and unfriendly tongue" at Feralia on 21 February. Dea Tacita is the same as the naiad Larunda. According to Ovid, this occurred because Dea Tacita had her tongue ripped off by Jupiter. Jupiter was angry with her because she told the nymph Juturna to flee from him because he planned to rape her. In this guise, Dea Tacita was worshipped at a festival called Larentalia on 23 December. Goddesses Mutae Tacitae were invoked to destroy a hated person: in an inscription from Cambodunum in Raetia, someone asks "ut mutus sit Quartus" and "erret fugiens ut mus" ("that Quartus be mute" and that he "wander, fleeing, like a mouse"). Plutarch, who described Tacita as a Muse, states that Numa Pompilius credited Tacita for his oracular insight and taught the Romans to worship her.
