= Lacus Juturnae =

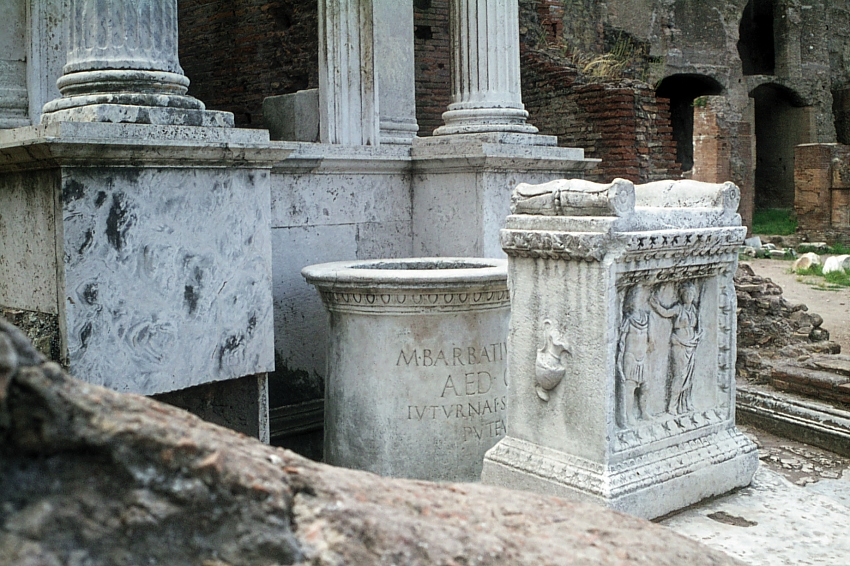
- The aedicula and marble altar of the Lacus Iuturnae.

- Location within Rome
- 41°53′31″N 12°29′9″E
- Type: fountain
- Location: Regione VIII Forum Romanum

The Lacus Iuturnae, or Lacus Juturnae or Spring of Juturna, is the name of a formal pool built by the Romans near a spring or well in the Roman Forum. The pool was part of a shrine dedicated to the water nymph Juturna, and the name Lacus Iuturnae is also used for the spring and the shrine, both next to the pool.

The site was initially excavated by Giacomo Boni in the early twentieth century. Excavations from the 1980s onwards were supervised by Eva Margareta Steinby.

== Legends ==
The shrine marks a place where Roman legend claims the divine twins Castor and Pollux stopped to water their horses while passing through the city, and where they announced Roman victory at the Battle of Lake Regillus, 495 BC. The Vestal Virgins used this spring to supply water for their religious ceremonies. The water at the Lacus Iuturnae was thought to have healing properties. The elderly and infirm would go to the spring with offerings in order to secure the assistance of Juturna in curing their malady.

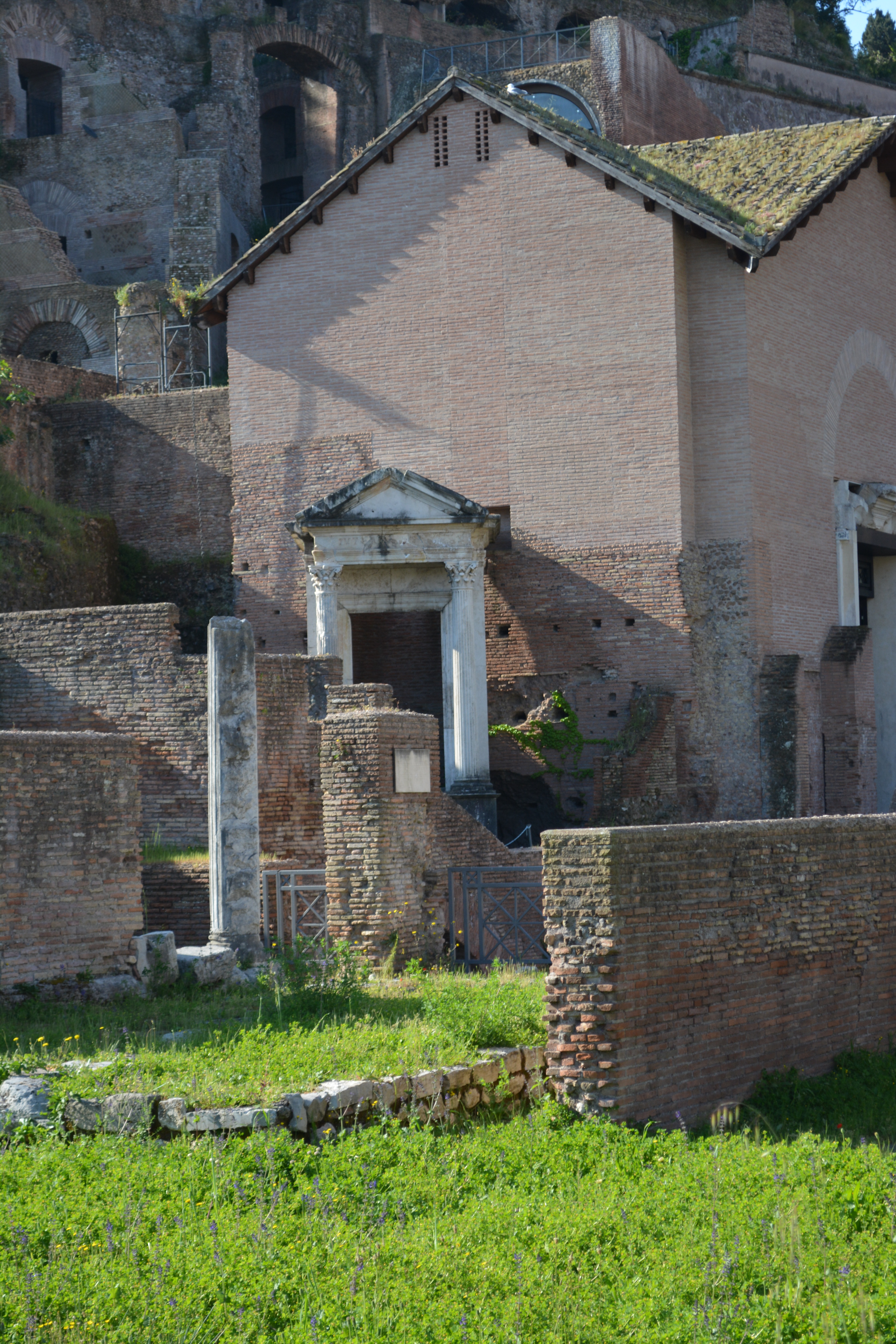
Remains of a shrine dedicated to the water Nymph Juturna in the Roman Forum. Photo taken in 2014.
