= Tarutius =

In Roman mythology, Tarutius or Tarrutius was a wealthy merchant married to Acca Larentia. According to Plutarch's Life of Romulus, the keeper of the Temple of Hercules challenged the hero to a game of dice with Hercules to receive a night with a beautiful woman and a fine spread and the god to provide the temple keeper with a valuable gift if the keeper was successful.

As Hercules won the contest, the keeper procured the services of Acca Larentia for the night and provided a fine supper. In the morning, Hercules suggested that she approach the first man she met on leaving the temple. Tarutius was the man whom she met and the couple ended up marrying. Tarutius was a wealthy, older man with a large estate and is often believed to be an Etruscan.

Tarutius died shortly after their marriage, leaving no children. Acca Larentia inherited the estate and, when she disappeared, her will was found devoting the estate to Rome. This version is considered to be the basis for the full legal entitlement of areas claimed by Rome.

Augustine of Hippo referred to the legend in his book The City of God as an example of how the pagan gods are supposed to have delighted in human sensual pleasures. In St. Augustine's version, Tarutius is held to be a younger man whom Acca Larentia meets after spending the night with Hercules in a dream. Tarutius is held to have had kept Acca Larentia as his mistress for many years, leaving his estate to her on his death. She in turn leaves the estate to Rome in her will, which is found when she mysteriously disappears.
