= Feralia =

Ancient Roman festival honoring the spirits of the dead

- Observed by: Roman Empire
- Date: 21 February
- Frequency: annual

Ferālia /fɪˈreɪliə/ was an ancient Roman public festival celebrating the Manes (Roman spirits of the dead, particularly the souls of deceased individuals) which fell on 21 February as recorded by Ovid in Book II of his Fasti. This day marked the end of Parentalia, a nine-day festival (13–21 February) honoring the dead ancestors.

Roman citizens were instructed to bring offerings to the tombs of their dead ancestors which consisted of at least "an arrangement of wreaths, a sprinkling of grain and a bit of salt, bread soaked in wine and violets scattered about." Additional offerings were permitted; however, the dead were appeased with just the aforementioned. These simple offerings to the dead were perhaps introduced to Latium by Aeneas, who poured wine and scattered violet flowers on his father Anchises' tomb. Ovid tells of a time when Romans, in the midst of war, neglected Feralia, which prompted the spirits of the departed to rise from their graves in anger, howling and roaming the streets. After this event, tribute to the tombs were then made and the ghastly hauntings ceased. To indicate public mourning, marriages of any kind were prohibited on the Feralia, and Ovid urged mothers, brides, and widows to refrain from lighting their wedding torches. Magistrates stopped wearing their insignia and any worship of the gods was prohibited as it "should be hidden behind closed temple doors; no incense on the altar, no fire on the hearth."

== Rites and tradition ==
As concerns public rites nothing of them survives, however on this day as described by Ovid, an old drunken woman (anus ebria) sits in a circle with other girls performing rites in the name of the mute goddess Tacita who is identified with the nymph Lara or Larunda. The ritual consists of the old woman placing three bits of incense, with three of her fingers, beneath a threshold where a mouse is unknowingly buried. She then rolls seven black beans in her mouth, and smears the head of a fish with pitch, impaling it with a bronze needle, and roasting it in a fire. After she formally declaims the purpose of her actions, as customary in Greco-Roman magic ritual, saying, "I have gagged spiteful tongues and muzzled unfriendly mouths" (Hostiles linguas inimicaque uinximus ora), she departs intoxicated. The use of the black beans in the old woman's ritual may be related to rites that lend themselves to another festival of the dead in the month of May, called Lemuria. During Lemuria the dead ancestor spirits, particularly the unburied, called lemures, emerge from their graves and visit the homes in which they had lived. It was then necessary to confront the unwelcome spirits and lure them out of one's house using specific actions and chants. According to Ovid, this includes the involvement of black beans to lure a spirit out of the home. "And after washing his (the householder) hands clean in spring water, he turns, and first he receives black beans and throws them away with face averted; but while he throws them, he says: 'These I cast; with these beans I redeem me and mine.' This he says nine times, without looking back: the shade is thought to gather the beans, and to follow unseen behind. Again he touches water, and clashes Temesan bronze, and asks the shade to go out of his house. When he has said nine times, 'Ghosts of my fathers, go forth!' he looks back, and thinks that he has duly performed the sacred rites." Perhaps the black beans carried with them connotations of warding away or dispelling bad things in general, whether it be unwelcome spirits haunting a household as seen during Lemuria, or preventing undesired gossip towards an individual as in the old hag's ritual during Feralia. Also, in the context of sacrifices, the black beans are similar to the black animals used in sacrifice to the 'chthonic deities'.

It is implied through Ovid's choice of words, "hostiles linguas" and "inimicaque ora", that the ritual is intended to curb gossip about a girl's reputation. Gossip of such a nature and its consequences are the subject for the cause, which Ovid offers, of the Dea Tacita festival, which was held on the same day as the Feralia. Ovid then tells a story to explain the origins of Dea Tacitia, starting with Jupiter's untamed lust for the nymph Juturna. Juturna, aware of Jupiter's lust for her, hid within the Hazelwood forest and dove into her sisters' waters. Jupiter then gathered all the nymphs in Latium seeking their help in capturing Juturna, saying, "Your sister is spiting herself by shunning her own advantage, an entanglement with the highest god. Look out for us both. What will be a great pleasure for me will be in your sister's great interest. Block her as she flees at the bank of the river to keep her from jumping into its waters." One of the informed nymphs, Lara, would not hold her tongue and warned Juturna to flee. In addition, she approached Jupiter's wife Juno, saying, "Your husband loves the Naiad Juturna." As a result, Jupiter rips out Lara's tongue in anger and summons Mercury to escort her to be a nymph in the Underworld. During this mission, Mercury becomes lustful of Lara and copulates with her, begetting twins. These twins become the Lares, the guardians of intersections who watch over the city of Rome.

== See also ==
- Anthesteria
- Lemuria (festival)
- Parentalia

Similar observances in other cultures:

- All Souls' Day
- Bon (Japanese Buddhism)
- Day of the Dead (Mexican)
- Hungry Ghost Festival (Chinese)
- Qingming (Chinese)
