= Margaret C. Waites =

American classical scholar (1883–1923)

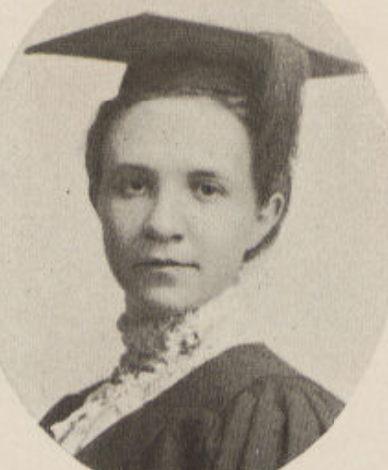
- Margaret C. Waites, from the 1905 Radcliffe College yearbook
- Born: October 7, 1883; Worcester, Massachusetts, U.S.
- Died: March 15, 1923 (aged 39); South Hadley, Massachusetts, U.S.
- Education: Radcliffe College
- Occupation(s): Classical scholar, college professor

Margaret Coleman Waites (October 7, 1883 – March 15, 1923) was an American classical scholar who was the head of the Latin department at Rockford College from 1909 to 1914 and head of the Latin Language and Literature department at Mount Holyoke College at the time of her death in 1923.

== Early life and education ==
Waites was born in Worcester, Massachusetts, the daughter of Alfred Waites and Kate Sanderson Waites. Her father was born in England. She graduated from Worcester Classical High School in 1902 and Radcliffe College in 1905. She completed a master's degree at Radcliffe in 1906, and her Ph.D. in 1910. Her thesis was "The Dramatic Art of Euripides" (1905). She was a member of Phi Beta Kappa.

== Career ==
Waites was head of the department of Latin at Rockford College from 1909 to 1914. She spent the 1912–1913 academic year at the American School of Classical Studies in Rome, supported by a fellowship from the American Association of Collegiate Alumnae. She began teaching at Mount Holyoke College in 1914, and was head of the Latin Language and Literature department there for about one year. In 1921 she wrote the Latin lyrics of a commemoration ode, sung at the twentieth anniversary of Mary E. Woolley's installation as president of Mount Holyoke. In that same year she attended the Classical Association conference in England, and reported on it for the Boston Transcript.

== Publications ==
Waites's work was published in Harvard Studies in Classical Philology, Classical Philology, The Classical Weekly, American Journal of Archaeology, the American Journal of Philology, and other publications.

- "Some Features of the Allegorical Debate in Greek Literature" (1912)
- "The Form of the Early Etruscan and Roman House" (1914)
- "The Performance of the Phormio, in Latin, at Mount Holyoke College" (1917)
- "The Meaning of the 'Dokana'" (1919)
- "Satura Redivivia" (1919)
- "The Nature of the Lares and their Representation in Roman Art" (1920)
- "The Deities of the Sacred Axe" (1923)
- "Latin an End in Itself" (1923)

== Personal life and legacy ==
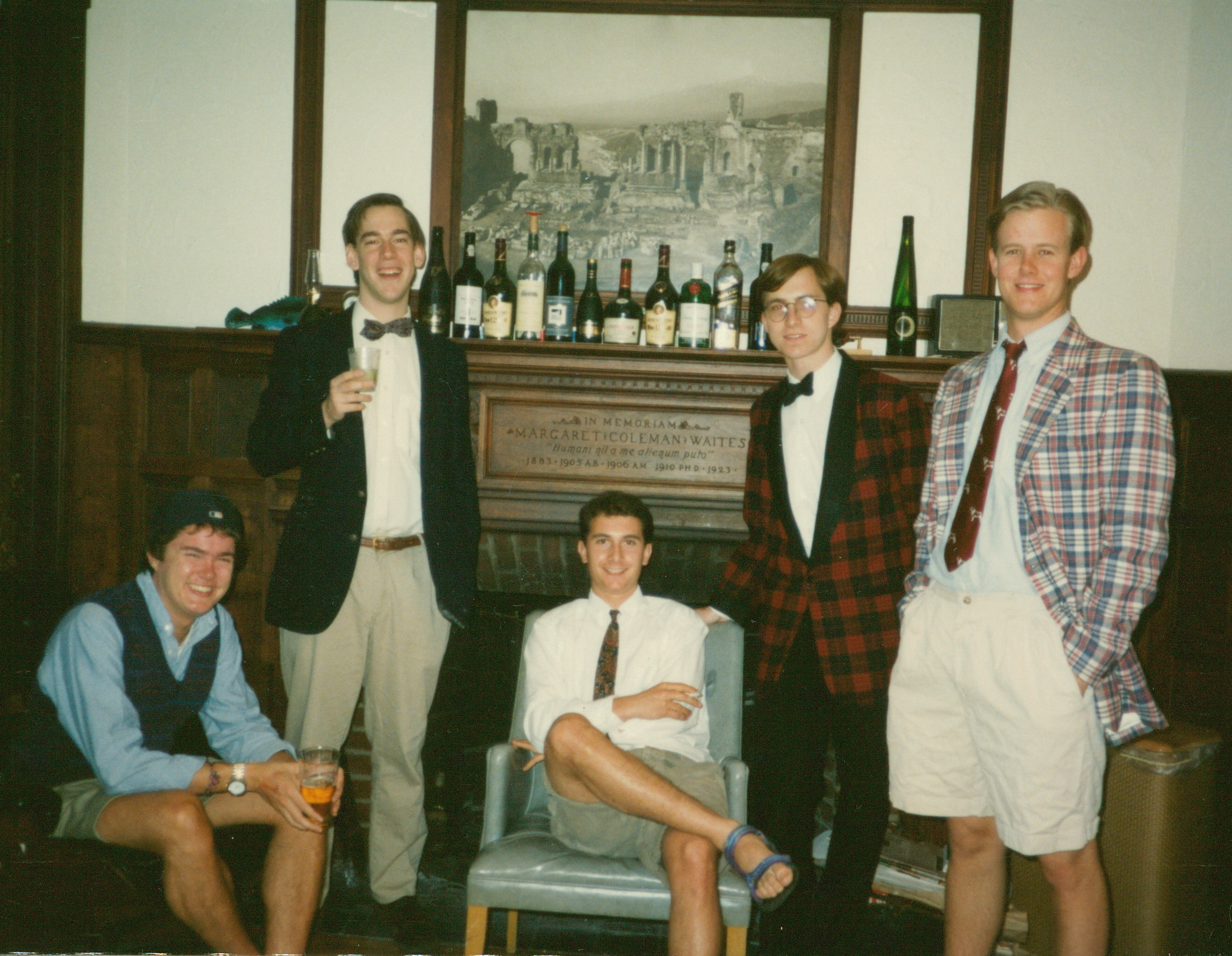
Residents of the Cabot House Library Suite at Harvard College, at a party honoring Margaret Coleman Waites in 1993

Waites's mother died in 1923, and Waites herself died of pneumonia a month later, aged 39.

Said Woolley at her memorial:

She was a scholar in the real meaning of the term, creative, constructive. She wrote much for classical publications and an article was no sooner out of her hands than she was thinking of the next. Her writing was forceful and clear, and her opinion was listened to with respect by other scholars ... Patient and sympathetic with the slow student, she was inspiring and stimulating with the brilliant student.

Waites bequeathed $1000 to the Society for the Prevention of Cruelty to Children and left her library, her personal effects, and $27,000 to Radcliffe College. According to Harvard campus legend (Radcliffe College and Harvard College having merged in the late 20th century), Waites's ghost supposedly haunts a suite of undergraduate rooms in Cabot House – rooms which used to be part of the house library – where her books are shelved.
