= Parentalia =

Roman feast of familias

In ancient Rome, the Parentalia (Latin pronunciation: [parɛnˈtaːlɪ.a]) or dies parentales ([ˈdɪ.eːs parɛnˈtaːleːs], "ancestral days") was a nine-day festival held in honour of family ancestors, beginning on 13 February.

Although the Parentalia was a holiday on the Roman religious calendar, its observances were mainly domestic and familial. The importance of the family to the Roman state, however, was expressed by public ceremonies on the opening day, the Ides of February, when a Vestal conducted a rite for the collective di parentes of Rome at the tomb of Tarpeia.

== Overview ==
Ovid describes sacred offerings (sacrificia) of flower-garlands, wheat, salt, wine-soaked bread and violets to the "shades of the dead" (Manes or Di manes) at family tombs, which were located outside Rome's sacred boundary (pomerium). These observances were meant to strengthen the mutual obligations and protective ties between the living and the dead and were a lawful duty of the paterfamilias (head of the family). Parentalia concluded on 21 February in the midnight rites of Feralia, when the paterfamilias addressed the malevolent, destructive aspects of his Manes.

Feralia was a placation and exorcism: Ovid thought it a more rustic, primitive and ancient affair than the Parentalia itself. It appears to have functioned as a cleansing ritual for Caristia on the following day when the family held an informal banquet to celebrate the affectionate bonds between themselves and their benevolent ancestral dead (Lares). The emphasis on the collective cult for the Manes and early di parentes implies their afterlife as vague and lacking individuation. In later cults they are vested with personal qualities, and in Imperial cult, they acquired divine numen and became divi, divine entities.

From Parentalia to Caristia all temples were closed, marriages were forbidden, and "magistrates appeared without their insignia," an indication that no official business was conducted. William Warde Fowler describes the Parentalia as "practically a yearly renewal of the rite of burial".

Individuals might also be commemorated on their birthday (dies natalis). Some would be commemorated throughout the year on marked days of the month, such as the Kalends, Nones or Ides, when lamps might be lit at the tomb. The Lemuria on 9, 11 and 13 May was aimed at appeasing "kinless and hungry" spirits of the dead.

== See also ==
- Chinese ancestor veneration
- Jesa, ancestral rites of Korea
- Qingming Festival
- Roman funerary practices
- Veneration of the dead
- Day of the Dead
