= Manes =

Roman deities believed to be the souls of the dead

In ancient Roman religion, the Manes (/ˈmeɪniːz/, Latin: mānēs, Classical Latin: [ˈmaː.neːs̠]) or Di Manes are chthonic deities sometimes thought to represent souls of deceased loved ones. They were associated with the Lares, Lemures, Genii, and Di Penates as deities (di) that pertained to domestic, local, and personal cult. They belonged broadly to the category of di inferi, "those who dwell below", the undifferentiated collective of divine dead. The Manes were honored during the Parentalia and Feralia in February.

The theologian St. Augustine, writing about the subject a few centuries after most of the Latin pagan references to such spirits, differentiated Manes from other types of Roman spirits:

Apuleius "says, indeed, that the souls of men are demons, and that men become Lares if they are good, Lemures or Larvae if they are bad, and Manes if it is uncertain whether they deserve well or ill... He also states that the blessed are called in Greek εὐδαίμονες [eudaimones], because they are good souls, that is to say, good demons, confirming his opinion that the souls of men are demons."

— City of God, Book IX, Chapter 11

Latin spells of antiquity were often addressed to the Manes.

== Etymology and inscriptions ==
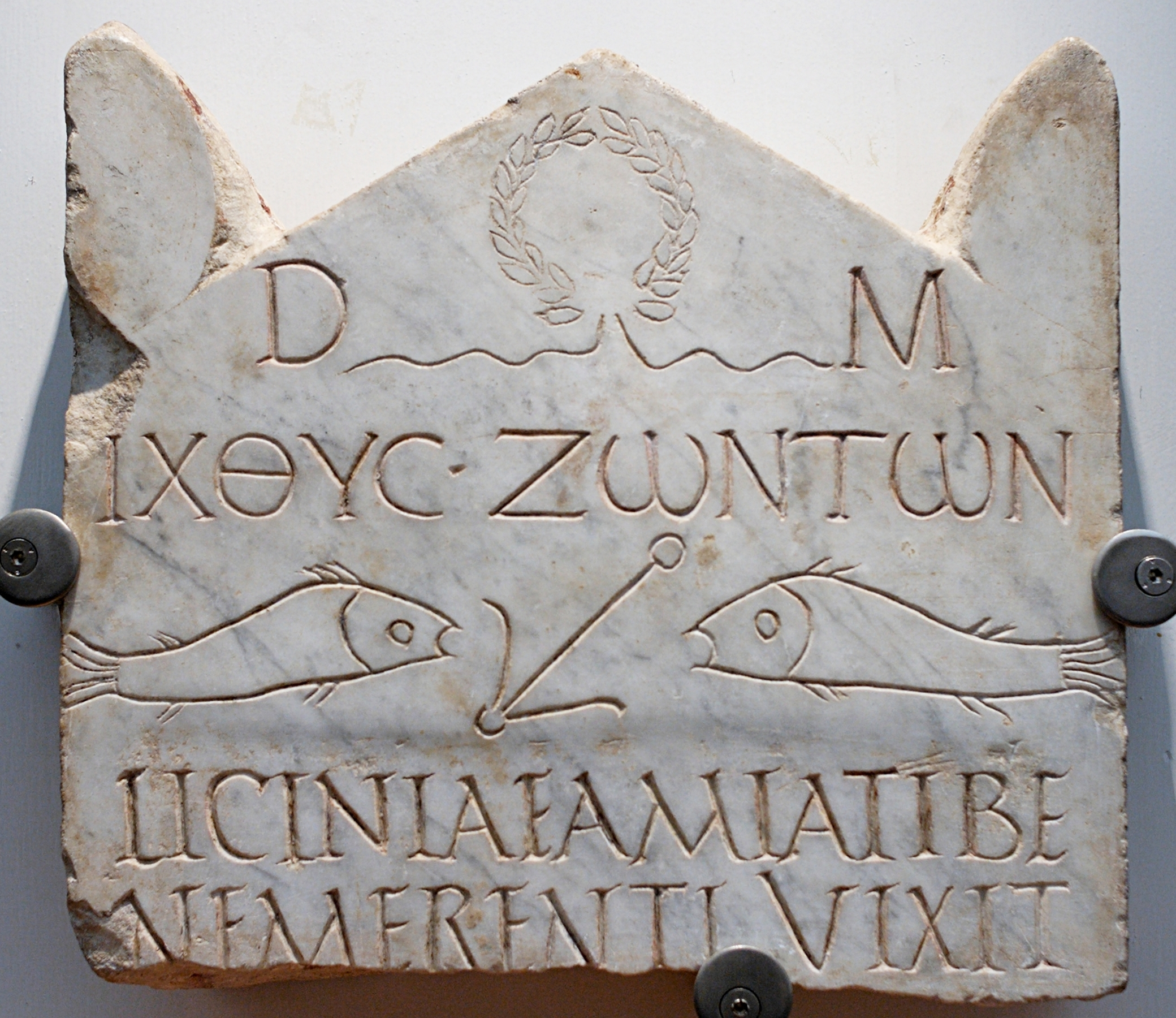
The abbreviation D.M. at the top of this 3rd-century Christian tombstone stands for Dis Manibus, "to the Spirits of the Dead"

Manes may be derived from "an archaic adjective manus—good—which was the opposite of immanis (monstrous)".

Roman tombstones often included the letters D.M., which stood for Dis Manibus, literally "to the Manes", or figuratively, "to the spirits of the dead", an abbreviation that continued to appear even in Christian inscriptions.

The Manes were offered blood sacrifices. The gladiatorial games, originally held at funerals, may have been instituted in the honor of the Manes. According to Cicero, the Manes could be called forth from the caves near Lake Avernus.

== Lapis manalis ==
When a new town was founded, a round hole would be dug and a stone called a lapis manalis would be placed in the foundations, representing a gate to the underworld. Due to similar names, the lapis manalis is often confused with the lapis manilis in commentaries even in antiquity: "The 'flowing stone' … must not be confused with the stone of the same name which, according to Festus, was the gateway to the underworld."

Of this we have a characteristic example in the ceremony of the aquaelicium, designed to produce rain after a long drought. In classical times the ceremony consisted in a procession headed by the pontifices, which bore the sacred rain-stone from its resting-place by the Porta Capena to the Capitol, where offerings were made to the sky-deity, Iuppiter, but from the analogy of other primitive cults and the sacred title of the stone (lapis manalis), it is practically certain that the original ritual was the purely imitative process of pouring water over the stone.

— Cyril Bailey, The Religion of Ancient Rome

== See also ==
- Ancestor veneration
- Pitrs
- Preta
