= Lares Familiares =

Ancient Roman household deities

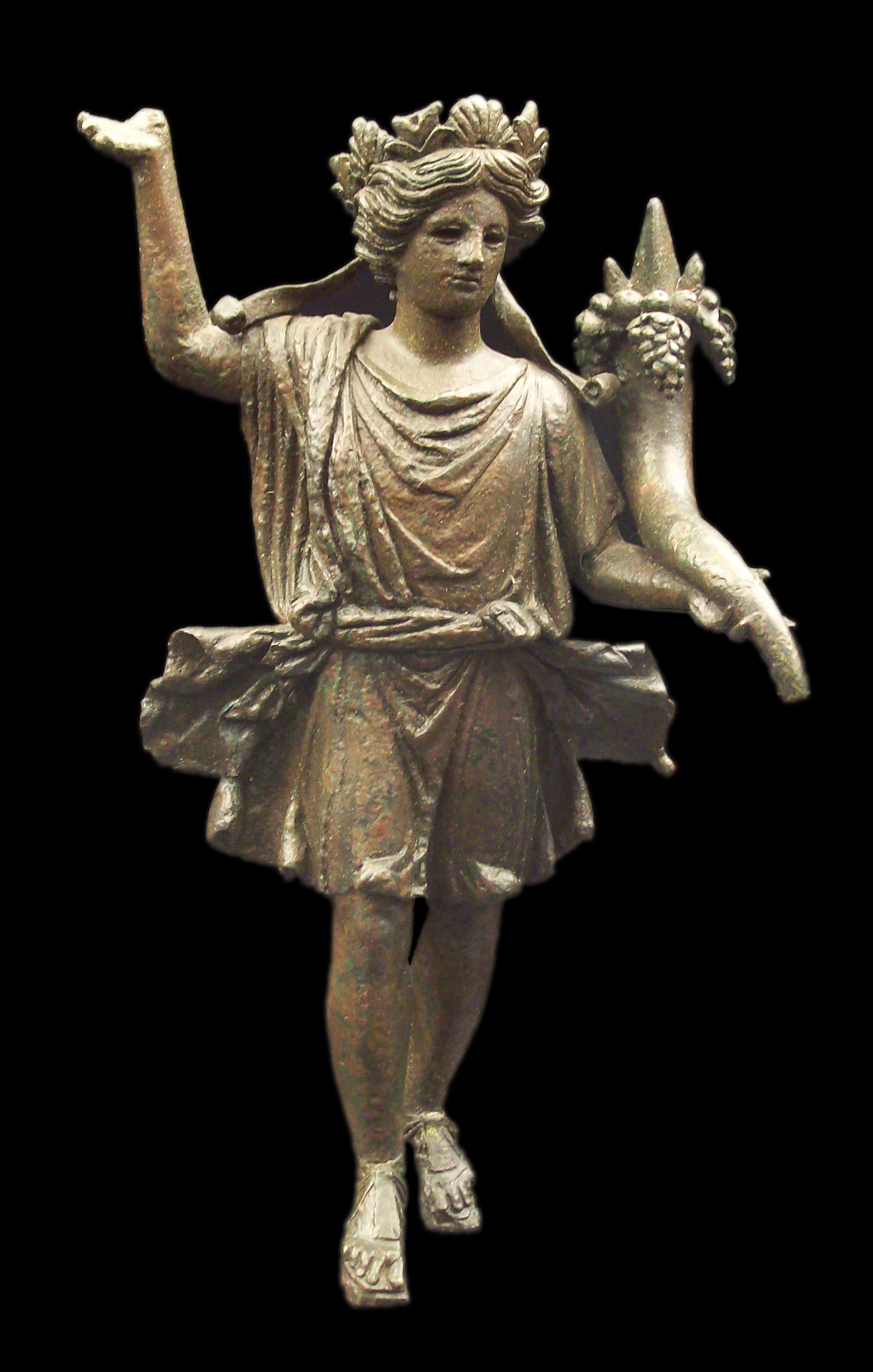
Bronze Lar Familiaris from the 1st century CE (M.A.N., Madrid).

Lares Familiares are guardian household deities and tutelary deities in ancient Roman religion. The singular form is Lar Familiaris. Lares were thought to influence all that occurred within their sphere of influence or location. In well-regulated, traditional Roman households, the household Lar or Lares were given daily cult and food-offerings, and were celebrated at annual festivals. They were identified with the home to the extent that a homeward-bound Roman could be described as going ad larem ("to the Lar").

== Origins ==
The name "Lar" is of uncertain origin. It seems to derive from the Etruscan lar, lars, or larth, meaning "lord". Ancient Greek and Roman authors offer "heroes" and "daimones" as translations of "Lares"

== Functions ==
The Lar Familiaris cared for the welfare and prosperity of a Roman household. A household's lararium (plural lararia), a shrine to the Lar Familiaris and other domestic divinities, usually stood near the dining hearth or, in a larger dwelling, the semi-public atrium or reception area of the dwelling. A lararium could be a wall-cupboard with doors, an open niche with small-scale statuary, a projecting tile, a small freestanding shrine, or simply the painted image of a shrine; most Romans lived in apartment blocks or small-scale rural houses, with minimal indoor facilities.

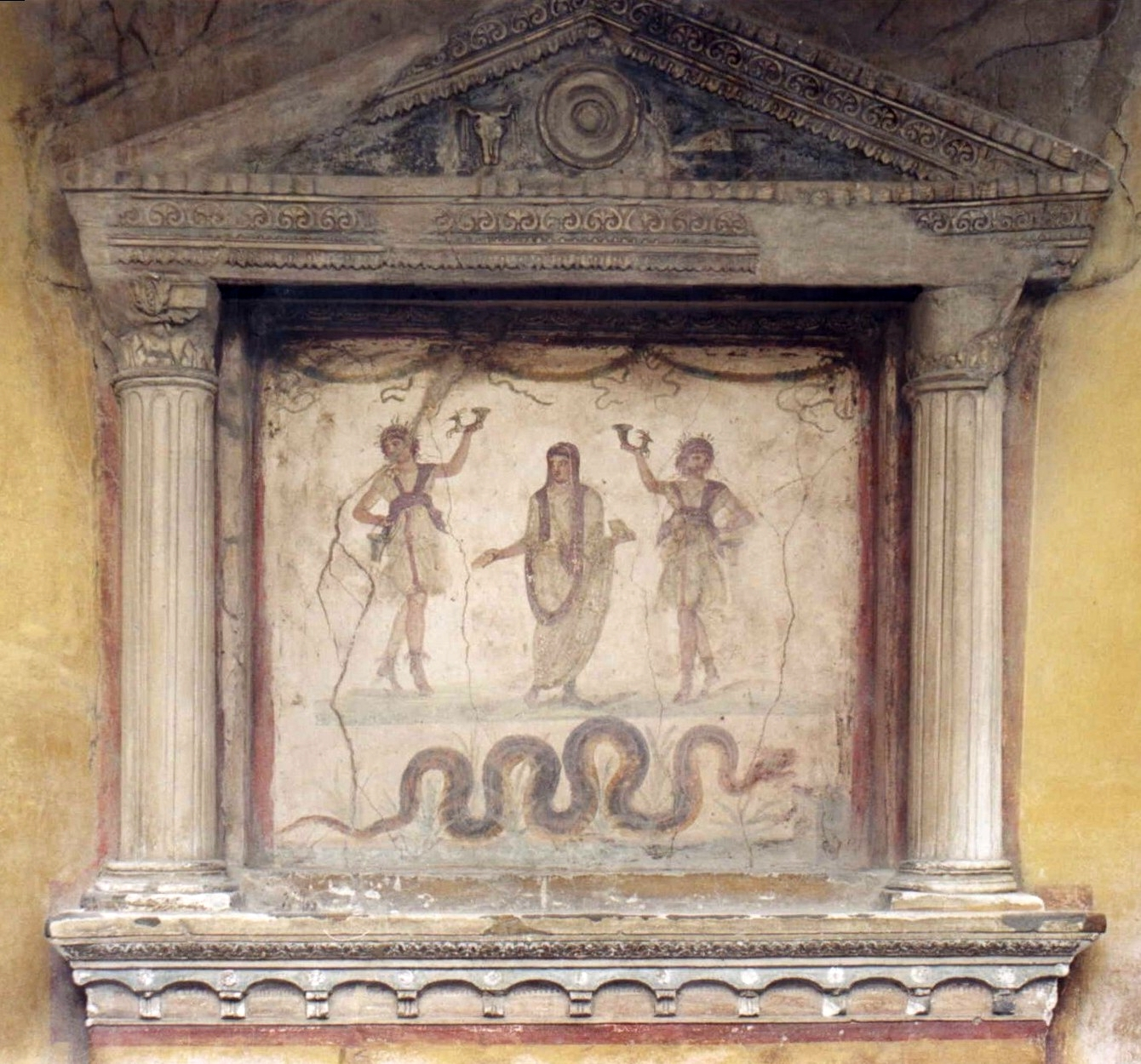
Lararium at the House of the Vettii: Two Lares, each holding a rhyton, flank an ancestor-genius holding a libation bowl and incense box, his head covered as if for sacrifice. The snake, associated with the land's fertility and thus prosperity, approaches a low, laden altar. The shrine's tympanum shows a patera, ox-skull and sacrificial knife.

The symbolism and meanings conveyed by lararia and their contents are much disputed. Lararia usually held images of one or more bearded or crested snakes, which are presumed to represent the family genius, fertility, or generative or procreative power. Lararia almost always contain the central painted image of a togate man, head covered by a fold of his toga, as if at worship or fulfilling his domestic priestly duties, carrying or offering a patera, or sacrificial vessel. This figure is usually said to represent the head of the household, or paterfamilias. He is symmetrically flanked by two painted or sculpted Lares. The Lar Familiaris is a more-or-less standard image, like other lares he is young, slender, clad in high boots, a short tunic, and a hitched undergarment. Garlands adorn his head, and he is lithe, graceful, and nimble. He stands on tiptoe, and offers a rhyton, patera, or both; or sometimes, a cornucopia. The Lar's statue could be moved from the lararium to wherever its presence was needed. It could be placed on a dining table during feasts or be a witness at weddings and other important family events. Brides were expected to give a coin to the Lares of the crossroads (Lares Compitalicii) of their new neighbourhood, and one to the lar of their new home.

References to domestic religious practice often pair the Lares together with the Penates. Penates, although also domestic guardian spirits, were more specifically protectors of the master of the household and his immediate family. The Lar Familiaris, on the other hand, protected all household members, free or slave, and was associated with a particular place. If a family moved out, their Penates went with them, but the Lar stayed. Tradition holds that a family's Lar would generously help those who honored him by devotionals and sacrifices, but would turn his back to those who would not offer him thanks or neglected him.

The Roman playwright Plautus offers a moral tale concerning a household and its Lar. In the Aulularia (lines 1–36) a grandfather begs his Lar to hide the family gold, so the Lar buries it under the hearth. When the grandfather dies, the Lar does not reveal where the gold is hidden because the son has never remembered to honor the Lar; nor has the grandson, Euclio, a frightful miser. Euclio's daughter is ready to marry, pregnant by an elderly, wealthy neighbour, but has no dowry. However, she shows a pious disposition to the Lar and towards her family, so the Lar sets in motion a complicated chain of events whereby Euclio finds the gold. Much of the play is incomplete, but what survives has Euclio seeing the error of his miserly ways. He bestows the gold upon his daughter for a dowry, so that all ends well.

== See also ==
- Teraphim
- Familiar
