= Larentalia =

Roman festival

The Roman festival of Larentalia was held on 23 December but was ordered to be observed twice a year by Augustus; by some supposed to be in honour of the Lares, a kind of domestic genii, or divinities, worshipped in houses, and esteemed the guardians and protectors of families, supposed to reside in chimney-corners. Others have attributed this feast in honour of Acca Larentia, the nurse of Romulus and Remus, and wife of Faustulus. During this festival, offerings were made to the dead, usually at altars dedicated to Acca Larentia. A sacrifice was typically offered in the Velabrum, the spot where Acca Larentia is buried. Larentalia was part of a series of ancient Roman festivals and holidays celebrating the end of the old year and the start of the new.
