= Juturna =

Roman mythological figure

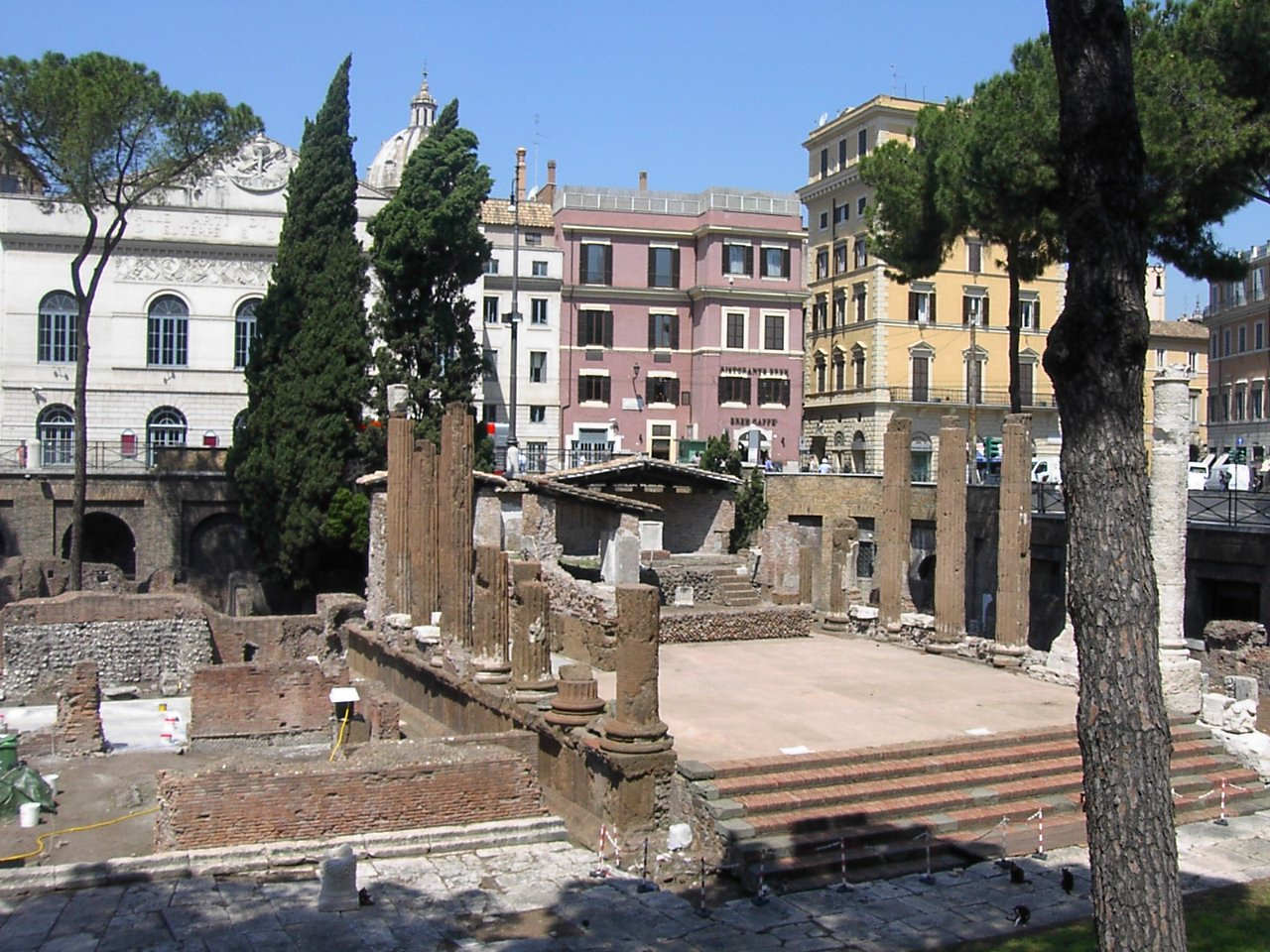
Temple of Juturna in Largo di Torre Argentina, Rome.

In the myth and religion of ancient Rome, Juturna, or Diuturna, was a goddess of fountains, wells and springs, and the mother of Fontus by Janus.

== Mythology ==
Juturna was an ancient Latin deity of fountains, who in some myths was turned by Jupiter into a water nymph – a Naiad – and given by him a sacred well in Lavinium, Latium, as well as another one near the temple to Vesta in the Forum Romanum. Her original home was said to be on the mythological river Numicius.

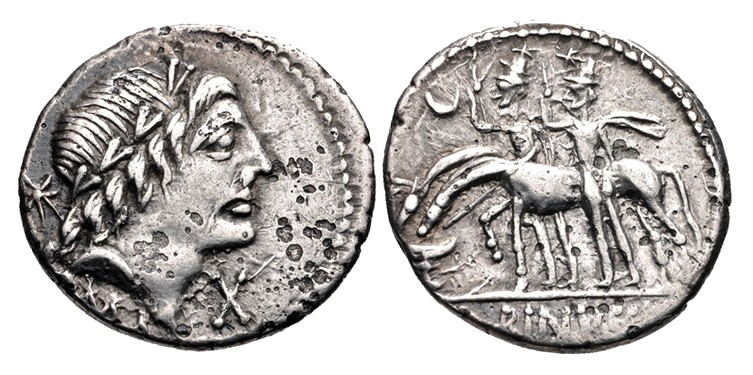
Denarius issued in 96 BC with Castor and Pollux watering their horses at the fountain of Juturna, and the laureate head of Apollo on the obverse

The pool next to the second well in the Roman Forum (Rome) was called Lacus Juturnae. A local water nymph or river-god generally presides over a single body of water, but Juturna has broader powers which probably reflect her original importance in Latium, where she had temples in Rome and Lavinium, a cult of healthful waters at Ardea, and the fountain/well next to the lake in the Roman forum. It was here in Roman legend that the deities Castor and Pollux watered their horses after bringing news of the Roman victory at the Battle of Lake Regillus in 496 BC (Valerius Maximus, I.8.1; Plutarch, Life of Aemilius Paulus, 25.2, Life of Coriolanus, 3.4).

A temple was erected in her honour after the first Punic war.

== In literature ==
- Virgil makes her a sister of Turnus who supported him against Aeneas by giving him his sword after he dropped it in battle, as well as by taking him away from the battle when it seemed he would be killed. In the end, however, she could not save him from his fate, and retreated into her waters in mourning. Juturna is further hellenized by Juno’s conferral of catasterism (Aen. 12.143, 145), an act that links her with the Dioscuri. These divinities all share a similar function as helpers of mortals and had traditional cultic connections in early Latium.
- Ovid relates her affair with Jupiter (Greek Zeus): the secret was betrayed by another nymph, Larunda, whom Jupiter struck with muteness as punishment.

== Cult ==
Holloway has argued that the goddess shown carrying a winged helmet on early Roman coinage is Juturna, but her iconography is largely unknown. A later altar relief from the Temple of Castor and Pollux in the Roman Forum may depict her. A Roman festival was held in her honor on January 11, when she was given sacrifices and honored by the fontani (the men who maintained the fountains and aqueducts of Rome).

== Namesake ==
Juturna Lake in Antarctica is named after the deity.

Juturna is the name of American rock band Circa Survive's debut album.
