= Lemuria (festival) =

Ancient Roman festival of the dead

The Lemuralia or Lemuria was an annual event in the religion of ancient Rome, during which the Romans performed rites to exorcise any malevolent and fearful ghosts of the restless dead from their homes. These unwholesome spectres, the lemures or larvae were propitiated with chants and offerings of black beans.

== Observance ==
In the Julian calendar the three days of the festival were 9, 11, and 13 May. Lemuria's name and origin myth, according to Ovid, derives from a supposed Remuria instituted by Romulus to appease the angry spirit of his murdered twin, Remus. The philosopher Porphyry points out that Remus' death was violent, premature, and a matter of regret for Romulus. Toynbee defines lemures as ordinary di Manes, made harmful and spiteful to the living because "kinless and neglected" in death and after it, having no rites or memorial, free to leave their dead body but unable to enter the underworld or afterlife. A less common but more "mischievous and dangerous" type of ghost, known as larvae was thought to wander about the house with the lemures; the name, larva, is a rarity in any source, and seems to have also been used for a frightening type of theater mask. Dolansky believes that the Lemuralia was meant to help those family members who had died in circumstances that prevented or delayed their admission to the afterlife; those who had died "before their time," in their childhood or youth, through disease, war, assault or misadventure, or in circumstances that prevented their being given proper burial or funeral rites.

Ovid's is the only detailed account of Lemuria. The householder, perhaps with others, walks barefoot through the house at midnight. He washes his hands in spring water, takes his thumb between the fingers of his hand, to ward off any ghosts, then takes a mouthful of black beans and spits them out behind him or throws them behind himself, over his shoulder for the hungry lemures to gather, unseen. He chants "I send these; with these beans I redeem me and mine" (Haec ego mitto; his redimo meque meosque fabis) nine times; then the rest of the household clashes bronze pots while repeating, "Ghosts of my fathers and ancestors, be gone!" (Manes exite paterni!). The householder washes his hands in spring-water, three times. When he turns to see the results of the offering, or exorcism, no lemures are to be seen. Ovid uses both lemur and Manes for what are presumably the same ghosts, at the same festival, under different names but with little or no individuation other than differing levels of malice or benevolence. Presumably there was some overlap in identity. Larvae, on the other hand, were thought to have been entirely unforgiving, even demonic. Some of the literature presents them as persecuting the living, and torturing bad souls in Hades.

During the Lemuralia all temples were closed, and no marriages were allowed. The three days of the Lemuralia, and the performance of an Argei ceremony in the same month, supposedly a substitute for former human sacrifices, made the whole month of May unlucky for marriages. This is one possible explanation for Ovid's Mense Maio malae nubunt, in his Fasti 6.219-234, cited by Erasmus in his Adagia, 1.4.9; in English roughly "they marry badly who marry in May".

== Legacy ==
According to some cultural historians, Lemuria was Christianized as a feast day commemorating all Christian martyrs. Christians in 4th-century Roman Edessa held this feast on 13 May. Later, on 13 May in 609 or 610, Pope Boniface IV re-consecrated the Pantheon of Rome to the Blessed Virgin and all the martyrs; the feast of that dedicatio Sanctae Mariae ad Martyres has been celebrated at Rome ever since and started the feast of All Saints' Day.

== See also ==
- All Saints' Day
- Anthesteria
- Dziady
- Feralia
- Halloween
- Parentalia
- Radonitsa
- Setsubun, a similar Japanese custom

== Sources ==
- http://penelope.uchicago.edu/Thayer/E/Roman/Texts/secondary/SMIGRA*/Lemuralia.html Smith, William, 1875. Dictionary of Greek and Roman Antiquities.
