= Lemures =

Shades or spirits in Roman mythology

The lemures /ˈlɛmjəriːz/ were shades or spirits of the restless or malignant dead in Roman religion, sometimes used interchangeably with the term larvae (from Latin larva, 'mask'). The term lemures was first used by the Augustan poet Horace (in Epistles 2.2.209), and was the more common literary term during the Augustan era, with larvae being used only once by Horace. However, lemures is also uncommon: Ovid being the other main figure to employ it, in his Fasti, the six-book calendar poem on Roman holidays and religious customs. Later the two terms were used nearly or completely interchangeably, e.g. by St. Augustine in De Civitate Dei.

The word lemures can be traced to the Proto-Indo-European stem *lem-, which also appears in the name of the Greek monster Lamia.

== Description ==
Lemures may represent the wandering and vengeful spirits of those not afforded proper burial, funeral rites or affectionate cult by the living: they are thus not attested by tomb or votive inscriptions. Ovid interprets them as vagrant, unsatiated and potentially vengeful di manes or di parentes, ancestral gods or spirits of the underworld. To him, the rites of their cult suggest an incomprehensibly archaic, quasi-magical and probably very ancient rural tradition.

Lemures were formless and liminal, associated with darkness and its dread. In Republican and Imperial Rome, May 9, 11, and 13 were dedicated to their placation in the household practices of Lemuralia or Lemuria. The head of household (paterfamilias) would rise at midnight and cast black beans behind him with averted gaze; the Lemures were presumed to feast on them. Black was the appropriate colour for offerings to chthonic deities. William Warde Fowler interprets the gift of beans as an offer of life, and points out that they were a ritual pollution for priests of Jupiter. The lemures themselves were both fearsome and fearful: any malevolent shades dissatisfied with the offering of the paterfamilias could be startled into flight by the loud banging of bronze pots.

== In scientific Latin ==
The lemures inspired Linnaeus's Modern Latin backformation lemur (denoting a type of primates). According to Linnaeus' own explanation, the name was selected because of the nocturnal activity and slow movements of the slender loris. Being familiar with the works of Virgil and Ovid and seeing an analogy that fit with his naming scheme, Linnaeus adapted the term lemur for these nocturnal primates. However, it has been commonly and falsely assumed that Linnaeus was referring to the ghost-like appearance, reflective eyes, and ghostly cries of lemurs. In Goethe's Faust, a chorus of Lemurs who serve Mephistopheles dig Faustus' grave.

== In the English Daemonologie ==
In the book by King James I of England, Daemonologie, In Forme of a Dialogie, Divided into three Bookes, it is written:

Nowe I returne to my purpose: As to the first kinde of these spirites, that were called by the auncients by diuers names, according as their actions were. For if they were spirites that haunted some houses, by appearing in diuers and horrible formes, and making greate dinne: they were called Lemures or Spectra. If they appeared in likenesse of anie defunct to some friends of his, they wer called vmbræ mortuorum: And so innumerable stiles they got, according to their actiones, as I haue said alreadie. As we see by experience, how manie stiles they haue given them in our language in the like maner: Of the appearing of these spirites, wee are certified by the Scriptures, [marginal note - Esay. 13. Iere. 50] where the Prophet ESAY 13. and 34. cap. threatening the destruction of Babell and Edom: declares, that it shal not onlie be wracked, but shall become so greate a solitude, as it shall be the habitackle of Howlettes, and of ZIIM and IIM, which are the proper Hebrewe names for these Spirites. The cause whie they haunte solitarie places, it is by reason, that they may affraie and brangle the more the faith of suche as them alone hauntes such places. For our nature is such, as in companies wee are not so soone mooued to anie such kinde of feare, as being solitare, which the Deuill knowing well inough, hee will not therefore assaile vs but when we are weake: And besides that, GOD will not permit him so to dishonour the societies and companies of Christians, as in publicke times and places to walke visiblie amongst them. On the other parte, when he troubles certaine houses that are dwelt in, it is a sure token either of grosse ignorance, or of some grosse and slanderous sinnes amongst the inhabitantes thereof: which God by that extraordinarie rod punishes.
