= Janus =

Roman god

- God of all beginnings, gates, transitions, boundaries, roads, duality, doorways, passages, paths and endings
- Member of the di selecti
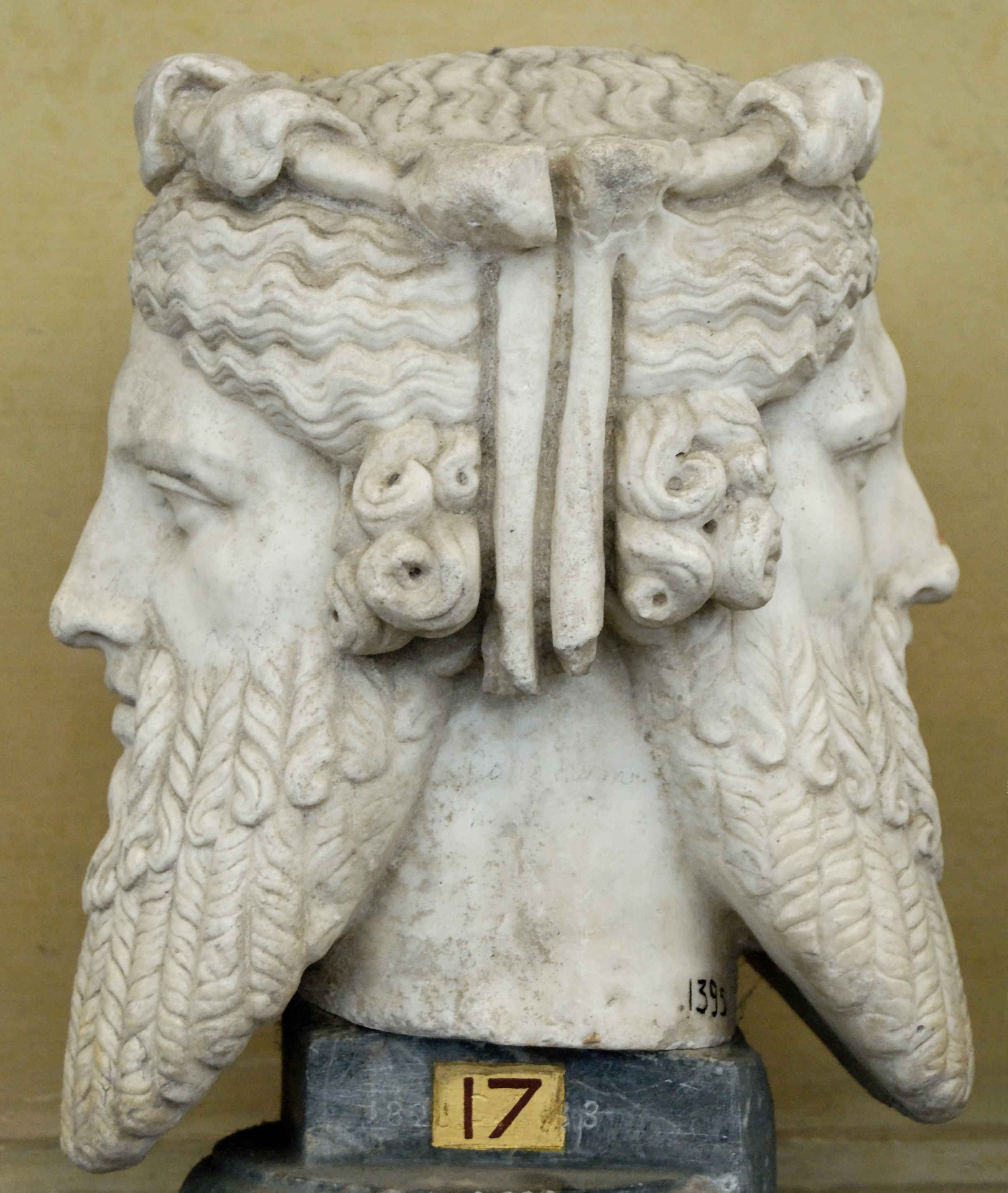
- Statue representing Janus Bifrons in the Vatican Museums
- Other names: Ianuspater ("Janus Father"), Ianus Quadrifrons ("Janus Fourfaced"), Ianus Bifrons ("Two-faced Janus")
- Abode: at the limits of Earth, at the extremity of Heaven
- Symbol: two faces

Genealogy
- Parents: None (primordial deity); Terra and Caelus (variant)
- Siblings: Saturn and Ops
- Consort: Camese, Venilia, and Juturna
- Children: Canens, Aithex, Olistene, Tiberinus, and Fontus

Equivalents
- Etruscan: Culsans

In ancient Roman religion and myth, Janus (/ˈdʒeɪnəs/ JAY-nəs; Latin: Iānus [ˈi̯aːnʊs]) is the god of beginnings, gates, transitions, time, duality, doorways, passages, frames, and endings. He is usually depicted as having a two-faced head. The month of January is named for Janus (Ianuarius). According to ancient Roman farmers' almanacs, Juno was mistaken as the tutelary deity of the month of January, as Juno is the tutelary deity of the month of June.

Janus presided over the beginning and ending of conflict, and hence war and peace. The gates of the Temple of Janus in Rome were opened in time of war and closed to mark the arrival of peace. As a god of transitions, he had functions pertaining to birth and to journeys and exchange, and in his association with Portunus, a similar harbor and gateway god, he was concerned with travelling, trading, and shipping.

Janus had no flamen or specialised priest (sacerdos) assigned to him, but the King of the Sacred Rites (rex sacrorum) himself carried out his ceremonies. Janus had a ubiquitous presence in religious ceremonies throughout the year. As such, Janus was ritually invoked at the beginning of each ceremony, regardless of the main deity honored on any particular occasion.

While the ancient Greeks had no known equivalent to Janus, there is considerable overlap with Culśanś of the Etruscan pantheon.

== Etymology ==
The name of the god Iānus, meaning in Latin 'arched passage, doorway', stems from Proto-Italic *iānu ('door'), ultimately from Proto-Indo-European *ieh₂nu ('passage'). It is cognate with Sanskrit yāti ('to go, travel'), Lithuanian jóti ('to go, ride'), Irish áth ('ford'), or Serbo-Croatian jàhati ('to ride').

Iānus would then be an action name expressing the idea of going, passing, formed on the root *yā- < *y-eð2- theme II of the root *ey- go from which eō, ειμι. Other modern scholars object to an Indo-European etymology either from Dianus or from root *yā-.

From Ianus derived ianua ("door"), and hence the English word "janitor" (Latin, ianitor).

=== Ancient interpretations ===
Three etymologies were proposed by ancient erudites, each of them bearing implications about the nature of the god. The first one is based on the definition of Chaos given by Paul the Deacon: hiantem, hiare, "be open", from which the word Ianus would derive by the loss of the initial aspirate. In this etymology, the notion of Chaos would define the primordial nature of the god.

Another etymology proposed by Nigidius Figulus is related by Macrobius: Ianus would be Apollo and Diana Iana, by the addition of a D for the sake of euphony. This explanation has been accepted by A. B. Cook and J. G. Frazer. It supports all the assimilations of Janus to the bright sky, the Sun and the Moon. It supposes a former *Dianus, formed on *dia- < *dy-eð2 from the Indo-European root *dey- shine represented in Latin by dies day, Diovis and Iuppiter. The form Dianus postulated by Nigidius, however, is not attested.

A third etymology indicated by Cicero, Ovid and Macrobius, which explains the name as Latin, deriving it from the verb ire ("to go") is based on the interpretation of Janus as the god of beginnings and transitions.

== Theology and functions ==
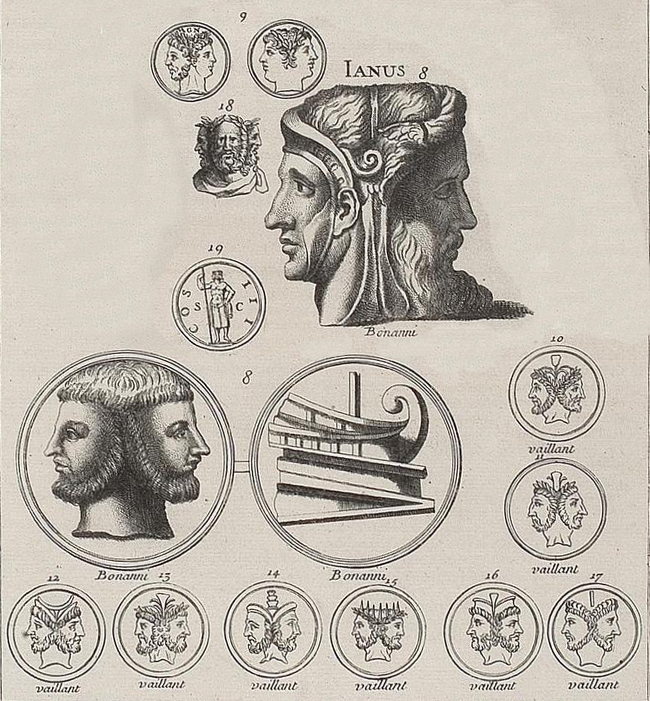
Different depictions of Janus from Bernard de Montfaucon's L'antiquité expliquée et représentée en figures

While the fundamental nature of Janus is debated, in most modern scholars' view the god's functions may be seen as being organised around a single principle: presiding over all beginnings and transitions, whether abstract or concrete, sacred or profane. Interpretations concerning the god's fundamental nature either limit it to this general function or emphasize a concrete or particular aspect of it (identifying him with light, the Sun, the Moon, time, movement, the year, doorways, bridges, etc.) or else see in the god a sort of cosmological principle, interpreting him as a uranic deity.

Almost all of these modern explanations were originally formulated by the ancients.

=== God of beginnings and passages ===
His function as god of beginnings has been clearly expressed in numerous ancient sources, among them most notably Cicero, Ovid, and Varro. As a god of motion, Janus looks after passages, causes actions to start and presides over all beginnings. Since movement and change are interconnected, he has a double nature, symbolised in his two-headed image. He has under his tutelage the stepping in and out of the door of homes, the ianua, which took its name from him, and not vice versa. Similarly, his tutelage extends to the covered passages named iani and foremost to the gates of the city, including the cultic gate of the Argiletum, named Ianus Geminus or Porta Ianualis from which he protects Rome against the Sabines. He is also present at the Sororium Tigillum, where he guards the terminus of the ways into Rome from Latium. He has an altar, later a temple near the Porta Carmentalis, where the road leading to Veii ended, as well as being present on the Janiculum, a gateway from Rome out to Etruria.

The connection of the notions of beginning (principium), movement, transition (eundo), and thence time was clearly expressed by Cicero. In general, Janus is at the origin of time as the guardian of the gates of Heaven: Jupiter himself can move forth and back because of Janus's working. In one of his temples, probably that of Forum Holitorium, the hands of his statue were positioned to signify the number 355 (the number of days in a lunar year), later 365, symbolically expressing his mastership over time. He presides over the concrete and abstract beginnings of the world, such as religion and the gods themselves, he too holds the access to Heaven and to other gods: this is the reason why men must invoke him first, regardless of the god they want to pray to or placate. He is the initiator of human life, of new historical ages, and financial enterprises: according to myth he was the first to mint coins and the as, first coin of the liberal series, bears his effigy on one face.

=== God of change ===
Janus frequently symbolized change and transitions such as the progress of past to future, from one condition to another, from one vision to another, and young people's growth to adulthood. He represented time because he could see into the past with one face and into the future with the other. Hence, Janus was worshipped at the beginnings of the harvest and planting times, as well as at marriages, deaths and other beginnings. He represented the middle ground between barbarism and civilization, rural and urban space, youth and adulthood. Having jurisdiction over beginnings Janus had an intrinsic association with omens and auspices.

=== Demi-god or a king reformator ===
Plutarch in his Parallel Lives mention that Numa Pompilius made January the first month in the calendar instead of March by the next reason: "he wished in every case that martial influences should yield precedence to civil and political. For this Janus, in remote antiquity, whether he was a demi-god or a king, was a patron of civil and social order, and is said to have lifted human life out of its bestial and savage state. For this reason he is represented with two faces, implying that he brought men's lives out of one sort and condition into another."

=== Position in the pantheon ===
Leonhard Schmitz suggests that he was likely the most important god in the Roman archaic pantheon. He was often invoked together with Iuppiter (Jupiter).

==== Structural peculiarity theory ====
In several of his works, G. Dumézil proposed the existence of a structural difference in level between the Proto-Indo-European gods of beginning and ending, and the other gods whom Dumézil postulated fall into a tripartite structure, reflecting the most ancient organization of society. So in IE religions there is an introducer god (such as Vedic Vâyu and Roman Janus) and a god of ending, and a nurturer goddess who is often also a fire spirit (such as Roman Vesta, Vedic Saraswati and Agni, Avestic Armaiti and Anâitâ) who show a sort of mutual solidarity.

The concept of 'god of ending' is defined in connection to the human point of reference, i.e. the current situation of man in the universe, and not to endings as transitions into new circumstances, which are under the jurisdiction of the gods of beginning, owing to the ambivalent nature of the concept. Thus the god of beginning is not structurally reducible to a sovereign god, nor the goddess of ending to any of the three categories on to which Dumézil distributed goddesses. There is though a greater degree of fuzziness concerning the function and role of goddesses, which may have formed a preexisting structure allowing the absorption of the local Mediterranean mother goddesses, nurturers, and protectresses .

As a consequence, the position of the gods of beginning would not be the issue of a diachronic process of debasement undergone by a supreme sky god, but rather a structural feature inherent to the culture's theology. The descent of primordial sky gods into the condition of deus otiosus is a well-known phenomenon in many religions. Dumézil himself observed and discussed in many of his works the phenomenon of the fall of archaic celestial deities in numerous societies of ethnologic interest.

Mircea Eliade evaluated Dumezil's views (1946) positively, and recommended their use in comparative research on Indo-European religions.

==== Solar god theories ====
According to Macrobius who cites Nigidius Figulus and Cicero, Janus and Jana (Diana) are a pair of divinities, worshipped as Apollo or the sun and moon, whence Janus received sacrifices before all the others, because through him is apparent the way of access to the desired deity.

A similar solar interpretation has been offered by A. Audin who interprets the god as the issue of a long process of development, starting with the Sumeric cultures, from the two solar pillars located on the eastern side of temples, each of them marking the direction of the rising sun at the dates of the two solstices: the southeastern corresponding to the Winter and the northeastern to the Summer solstice. These two pillars would be at the origin of the theology of the divine twins, one of whom is mortal (related to the NE pillar, nearest the Northern region where the sun does not shine) and the other is immortal (related to the SE pillar and the Southern region where the sun always shines). Later these iconographic models evolved in the Middle East and Egypt into a single column representing two torsos and finally a single body with two heads looking at opposite directions.

Numa, in his regulation of the Roman calendar, called the first month Januarius after Janus, according to tradition considered the highest divinity at the time.

== Temples ==
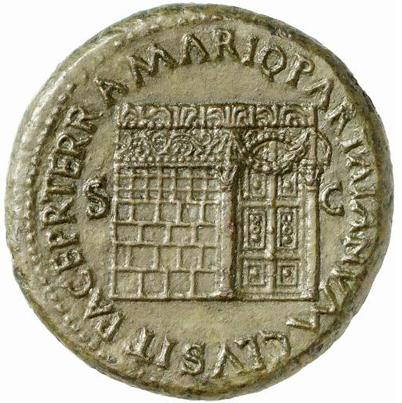
The temple of Janus with closed doors, on a sestertius issued under Nero in 66 AD from the mint at Lugdunum

Numa built the Ianus geminus (also Janus Bifrons, Janus Quirinus or Portae Belli), a passage ritually opened at times of war, and shut again when Roman arms rested. It formed a walled enclosure with gates at each end, situated between the old Roman Forum and that of Julius Caesar, which had been consecrated by Numa Pompilius himself. About the exact location and aspect of the temple there has been much debate among scholars. In wartime the gates of the Janus were opened, and in its interior sacrifices and vaticinia were held, to forecast the outcome of military deeds. The doors were closed only during peacetime, an extremely rare event. The function of the Ianus Geminus was supposed to be a sort of good omen: in time of peace it was said to close the wars within or to keep peace inside; in times of war it was said to be open to allow the return of the people on duty.

A temple of Janus is said to have been consecrated by the consul Gaius Duilius in 260 BC after the Battle of Mylae in the Forum Holitorium. It contained a statue of the god with the right hand showing the number 300 and the left the number 65—i.e., the length in days of the solar year—and twelve altars, one for each month.

The four-sided structure known as the Arch of Janus in the Forum Transitorium dates from the 1st century of the Christian era: according to common opinion it was built by the Emperor Domitian. However American scholars L. Ross Taylor and L. Adams Holland on the grounds of a passage of Statius maintain that it was an earlier structure (tradition has it the Ianus Quadrifrons was brought to Rome from Falerii) and that Domitian only surrounded it with his new forum. In fact the building of the Forum Transitorium was completed and inaugurated by Nerva in AD 96.

== Cult epithets ==
Another way of investigating the complex nature of Janus is by systematically analysing his cultic epithets: religious documents may preserve a notion of a deity's theology more accurately than other literary sources.

The main sources of Janus's cult epithets are the fragments of the Carmen Saliare preserved by Varro in his work De Lingua Latina, a list preserved in a passage of Macrobius's Saturnalia (I 9, 15–16), another in a passage of Johannes Lydus's De Mensibus (IV 1), a list in Cedrenus's Historiarum Compendium (I p. 295 7 Bonn), partly dependent on Lydus's, and one in Servius Honoratus's commentary to the Aeneis (VII 610). Literary works also preserve some of Janus's cult epithets, such as Ovid's long passage of the Fasti devoted to Janus at the beginning of Book I (89–293), Tertullian, Augustine and Arnobius.

=== Carmen Saliare ===
As may be expected the opening verses of the Carmen, are devoted to honouring Janus, thence were named versus ianuli. Paul the Deacon mentions the versus ianuli, iovii, iunonii, minervii. Only part of the versus ianuli and two of the iovii are preserved.

The manuscript has:

(paragraph 26): "cozeulodorieso. omia ũo adpatula coemisse./ ian cusianes duonus ceruses. dun; ianusue uet põmelios eum recum";

(paragraph 27): "diuum êpta cante diuum deo supplicante." "ianitos".

Many reconstructions have been proposed: they vary widely in dubious points and are all tentative, nonetheless one can identify with certainty some epithets:

- Cozeiuod orieso. Omnia vortitod Patulti; oenus es
- iancus (or ianeus), Iane, es, duonus Cerus es, duonus Ianus.
- Veniet potissimum melios eum recum.
- Diuum eum patrem (or partem) cante, diuum deo supplicate.
- ianitos.

The epithets that can be identified are:

Cozeuios
i.e. Conseuius the Sower, which opens the carmen and is attested as an old form of Consivius in Tertullian;
Patultius
the Opener;
Iancus or Ianeus
the Gatekeeper;
Duonus Cerus
the Good Creator;
rex
king (potissimum melios eum recum – the most powerful and best of kings);
diuum patrem (partem)
father of the gods (or part of the gods);
diuum deus
god of the gods;
ianitos
keeping track of time, Gatekeeper.

=== Other sources ===
The above-mentioned sources give: Ianus Geminus, I. Pater, I. Iunonius, I. Consivius, I. Quirinus, I. Patulcius and Clusivius (Macrobius above I 9, 15): Ι. Κονσίβιον, Ι. Κήνουλον, Ι. Κιβουλλιον, I. Πατρίκιον, I. Κλουσίβιον, I. Ιουνώνιον, I. Κυρινον, I. Πατούλκιον, I. Κλούσιον, I. Κουριάτιον (Lydus above IV 1); I. Κιβούλλιον, I. Κυρινον, I. Κονσαιον, I. Πατρίκιον (Cedrenus Historiarum Compendium I p. 295 7 Bonn); I. Clusiuius, I. Patulcius, I. Iunonius, I. Quirinus (Servius Aen. VII 610).

Even though the lists overlap to a certain extent (five epithets are common to Macrobius's and Lydus's list), the explanations of the epithets differ remarkably. Macrobius's list and explanation are probably based directly on Cornelius Labeo's work, as he cites this author often in his Saturnalia, as when he gives a list of Maia's cult epithets and mentions one of his works, Fasti. In relating Janus's epithets Macrobius states: "We invoke in the sacred rites". Labeo himself, as it is stated in the passage on Maia, read them in the lists of indigitamenta of the libri pontificum. On the other hand, Lydus's authority cannot have consulted these documents precisely because he offers different (and sometimes bizarre) explanations for the common epithets: it seems likely he received a list with no interpretations appended and his interpretations are only his own.

==== Pater ====
Pater is perhaps the most frequent epithet of Janus, found also in the composition Ianuspater. While numerous gods share this cultic epithet it seems the Romans felt it was typically pertinent to Janus. When invoked along with other gods, usually only he is called pater. For Janus the title is not just a term of respect; principally it marks his primordial role. He is the first of the gods and thus their father: the formula quasi deorum deum corresponds to diuum deus of the carmen Saliare. Similarly, in the expression duonus Cerus, Cerus means creator and is considered a masculine form related to Ceres. Lydus gives Πατρίκιος (Patricius) and explains it as autóchthon: since he does not give another epithet corresponding to Pater it may be inferred that Lydus understands Patricius as a synonym of Pater. There is no evidence connecting Janus to gentilician cults or identifying him as a national god particularly venerated by the oldest patrician families.

==== Geminus ====
Geminus is the first epithet in Macrobius's list. Although the etymology of the word is unclear, it is certainly related to his most typical character, that of having two faces or heads. The proof are the numerous equivalent expressions. The origin of this epithet might be either concrete, referring directly to the image of the god reproduced on coins and supposed to have been introduced by king Numa in the sanctuary at the lowest point of the Argiletum, or to a feature of the Ianus of the Porta Belli, the double gate ritually opened at the beginning of wars, or abstract, deriving metaphorically from the liminal, intermediary functions of the god themselves: both in time and space passages connected two different spheres, realms or worlds. The Janus quadrifrons or quadriformis, brought according to tradition from Falerii in 241 BC and installed by Domitian in the Forum Transitorium, although having a different meaning, seems to be connected to the same theological complex, as its image purports an ability to rule over every direction, element and time of the year. It did not give rise to a new epithet though.

==== Patulcius and Clusivius the 1st ====
Patulcius and Clusivius or Clusius are epithets related to an inherent quality and function of doors, that of standing open or shut. Janus as the Gatekeeper has jurisdiction over every kind of door and passage and the power of opening or closing them. Servius interprets Patulcius in the same way. Lydus gives an incorrect translation, "αντί του οδαιον" which however reflects one of the attributes of the god, that of being the protector of roads. Elsewhere Lydus cites the epithet θυρέος to justify the key held by Janus. The antithetical quality of the two epithets is meant to refer to the alterning opposite conditions and is commonly found in the indigitamenta: in relation to Janus, Macrobius cites instances of Antevorta and Postvorta, the personifications of two indigitations of Carmentis. These epithets are associated with the ritual function of Janus in the opening of the Porta Ianualis or Porta Belli. The rite might go back to times pre-dating the founding of Rome. Poets tried to explain this rite by imagining that the gate closed either war or peace inside the ianus, but in its religious significance it might have been meant to propitiate the return home of the victorious soldiers.

==== Quirinus ====
Quirinus is a debated epithet. According to some scholars, mostly Francophone, it looks to be strictly related to the ideas of the passage of the Roman people from war back to peace, from the condition of miles, soldier, to that of quiris, citizen occupied in peaceful business, as the rites of the Porta Belli imply. This is in fact the usual sense of the word quirites in Latin. Other scholars, mainly Germanophone, think it is related on the contrary to the martial character of the god Quirinus, an interpretation supported by numerous ancient sources: Lydus, Cedrenus, Macrobius, Ovid, Plutarch and Paul the Daecon.

Schilling and Capdeville counter that it is his function of presiding over the return to peace that gave Janus this epithet, as confirmed by his association on 30 March with Pax, Concordia and Salus, even though it is true that Janus as god of all beginnings presides also over that of war and is thus often called belliger, bringer of war as well as pacificus. This use is also discussed by Dumézil in various works concerning the armed nature of the Mars qui praeest paci, the armed quality of the gods of the third function and the arms of the third function.

Koch on the other hand sees the epithet Janus Quirinus as a reflection of the god's patronage over the two months beginning and ending the year, after their addition by king Numa in his reform of the calendar. This interpretation too would befit the liminal nature of Janus. The compound term Ianus Quirinus was particularly in vogue at the time of Augustus, its peaceful interpretation complying particularly well with the Augustan ideology of the Pax Romana.

The compound Ianus Quirinus is to be found also in the rite of the spolia opima, a lex regia ascribed to Numa, which prescribed that the third rank spoils of a king or chief killed in battle, those conquered by a common soldier, be consecrated to Ianus Quirinus. Schilling believes the reference of this rite to Ianus Quirinus to embody the original prophetic interpretation, which ascribes to this deity the last and conclusive spoils of Roman history.

==== Ποπάνων (Popanon, Libo?) ====
The epithet Ποπάνων (Popanōn) is attested only by Lydus, who cites Varro as stating that on the day of the kalendae he was offered a cake which earned him this title. There is no surviving evidence of this name in Latin, although the rite is attested by Ovid for the kalendae of January and by Paul. This cake was named ianual but the related epithet of Janus could not plausibly have been Ianualis: it has been suggested Libo which remains purely hypothetical. The context could allow an Etruscan etymology.

==== Iunonius ====
Janus owes the epithet Iunonius to his function as patron of all kalends, which are also associated with Juno. In Macrobius's explanation: "Iunonium, as it were, not only does he hold the entry to January, but to all the months: indeed all the kalends are under the jurisdiction of Juno". At the time when the rising of the new moon was observed by the pontifex minor the rex sacrorum assisted by him offered a sacrifice to Janus in the Curia Calabra while the regina sacrorum sacrificed to Juno in the regia.

Some scholars have maintained that Juno was the primitive paredra of the god. This point bears on the nature of Janus and Juno and is at the core of an important dispute: was Janus a debased ancient uranic supreme god, or were Janus and Jupiter co-existent, their distinct identities structurally inherent to their original theology?

Among Francophone scholars, Grimal and (implicitly and partially) Renard and Basanoff have supported the view of a uranic supreme god against Dumézil and Schilling. Among Anglophone scholars Frazer and Cook have suggested an interpretation of Janus as uranic supreme god.

Whatever the case, it is certain that Janus and Juno show a peculiar reciprocal affinity: while Janus is Iunonius, Juno is Ianualis, as she presides over childbirth and the menstrual cycle, and opens doors. Moreover, besides the kalends Janus and Juno are also associated at the rite of the Tigillum Sororium of 1 October, in which they bear the epithets Ianus Curiatius and Iuno Sororia. These epithets, which swap the functional qualities of the gods, are the most remarkable apparent proof of their proximity. The rite is discussed in detail in the section below.

==== Consivius ====
Consivius, sower, is an epithet that reflects the tutelary function of the god at the first instant of human life and of life in general, conception. This function is a particular case of his function of patron of beginnings. As far as man is concerned it is obviously of the greatest importance, even though both Augustine and some modern scholars see it as minor. Augustine shows astonishment at the fact that some of the dii selecti may be engaged in such tasks: "In fact Janus himself first, when pregnancy is conceived, ... opens the way to receiving the semen".

Varro on the other hand had clear the relevance of the function of starting a new life by opening the way to the semen and therefore started his enumeration of the gods with Janus, following the pattern of the Carmen Saliare. Macrobius gives the same interpretation of the epithet in his list: "Consivius from sowing (conserendo), i. e. from the propagation of the human genre, that is disseminated by the working of Janus." as the most ancient form. He though does not consider Conseuius to be an epithet of Janus but a theonym in its own right.

Lydus understands Consivius as βουλαιον (consiliarius) owing to a conflation with Consus through Ops Consiva or Consivia. The interpretation of Consus as god of advice is already present in Latin authors and is due to a folk etymology supported by the story of the abduction of the Sabine women, (which happened on the day of the Consualia aestiva), said to have been advised by Consus. However no Latin source cites relationships of any kind between Consus and Janus Consivius. Moreover, both the passages that this etymology requires present difficulties, particularly as it seems Consus cannot be etymologically related to adjective consivius or conseuius, found in Ops Consivia and thence the implied notion of sowing.

==== Κήνουλος (Coenulus) ====
Κήνουλος (Coenulus) and Κιβουλλιος (Cibullius) are not attested by Latin sources. The second epithet is not to be found in Lydus's manuscripts and is present in Cedrenus along with its explanation concerning food and nurture. The editor of Lydus R. Wünsch has added Cedrenus's passage after Lydus's own explanation of Coenulus as ευωχιαστικός, good host at a banquet. Capdeville considers Cedrenus's text to be due to a paleographic error: only Coenulus is indubitably an epithet of Janus and the adjective used to explain it, meaning to present and to treat well at dinner, was used in a ritual invocation before meals, wishing the diners to make good flesh. This is one of the features of Janus as shown by the myth that associates him with Carna, Cardea, Crane.

==== Curiatius ====
The epithet Curiatius is found in association with Iuno Sororia as designating the deity to which one of the two altars behind the Tigillum Sororium was dedicated. Festus and other ancient authors explain Curiatius by the aetiological legend of the Tigillum: the expiation undergone by P. Horatius after his victory over the Alban Curiatii for the murder of his own sister, by walking under a beam with his head veiled.

Capdeville sees this epithet as related exclusively to the characters of the legend and the rite itself: He cites the analysis by Dumézil as his authority.

Schilling supposes it was probably a sacrum originally entrusted to the gens Horatia that allowed the desacralisation of the iuvenes at the end of the military season, later transferred to the state. Janus's patronage of a rite of passage would be natural. The presence of Juno would be related to the date (Kalends), her protection of the iuvenes, soldiers, or the legend itself. Schilling's opinion is that it is related to curia, as the Tigillum was located not far from the curiae veteres.

Renard considered Schilling's interpretation unacceptable, even though supported by an inscription (lictor curiatius) because of the different quantity of the u, short in curiatius, curis and Curitis and long in curia. Moreover, it is part of the different interpretation of the meaning of the ritual of the Tigillum Sororium proposed by Herbert Jennings Rose, Kurt Latte, and Robert Schilling himself. Renard connects the epithet's meaning to the curis or cuiris, the spear of Juno Curitis as here she is given the epithet of Sororia, corresponding to the usual epithet Geminus of Janus and to the twin or feminine nature of the passage between two coupled posts.

In summary, the etymology of Curiatius remains uncertain.

== Rites ==
The rites concerning Janus were numerous. Owing to the versatile and far reaching character of his basic function marking all beginnings and transitions, his presence was ubiquitous and fragmented. Apart from the rites solemnizing the beginning of the new year and of every month, there were the special times of the year which marked the beginning and closing of the military season, in March and October respectively. These included the rite of the arma movēre on 1 March and that of the arma condĕre at the end of the month performed by the Salii, and the Tigillum Sororium on 1 October. Janus Quirinus was closely associated with the anniversaries of the dedications of the temples of Mars on 1 June (a date that corresponded with the festival of Carna, a deity associated with Janus: see below) and of that of Quirinus on 29 June (which was the last day of the month in the pre-Julian calendar). These important rites are discussed in detail below.

Any rite or religious act whatsoever required the invocation of Janus first, with a corresponding invocation to Vesta at the end (Janus primus and Vesta extrema). Instances are to be found in the Carmen Saliare, the formula of the devotio, the lustration of the fields and the sacrifice of the porca praecidanea, the Acta of the Arval Brethren.

Although Janus had no flamen, he was closely associated with the rex sacrorum who performed his sacrifices and took part in most of his rites: the rex held the first place in the ordo sacerdotum, hierarchy of priests. The flamen of Portunus performed the ritual greasing of the spear of the god Quirinus on 17 August, day of the Portunalia, on the same date that the temple of Janus in the Forum Holitorium had been consecrated by consul Gaius Duilius in 260 BC.

=== Beginning of the year ===
The winter solstice was thought to occur on 25 December. On 1 January was New Year's Day: the day was consecrated to Janus since it was the first of the new year and of the month (kalends) of Janus: the feria had an augural character as Romans believed the beginning of anything was an omen for the whole. Thus on that day it was customary to exchange cheerful words of good wishes. For the same reason everybody devoted a short time to his usual business, exchanged dates, figs and honey as a token of well wishing and made gifts of coins called strenae. Cakes made of spelt (far) and salt were offered to the god and burnt on the altar. Ovid states that in most ancient times there were no animal sacrifices and gods were propitiated with offerings of spelt and pure salt. This libum was named ianual and it was probably correspondent to the summanal offered the day before the Summer solstice to god Summanus, which however was sweet being made with flour, honey and milk.

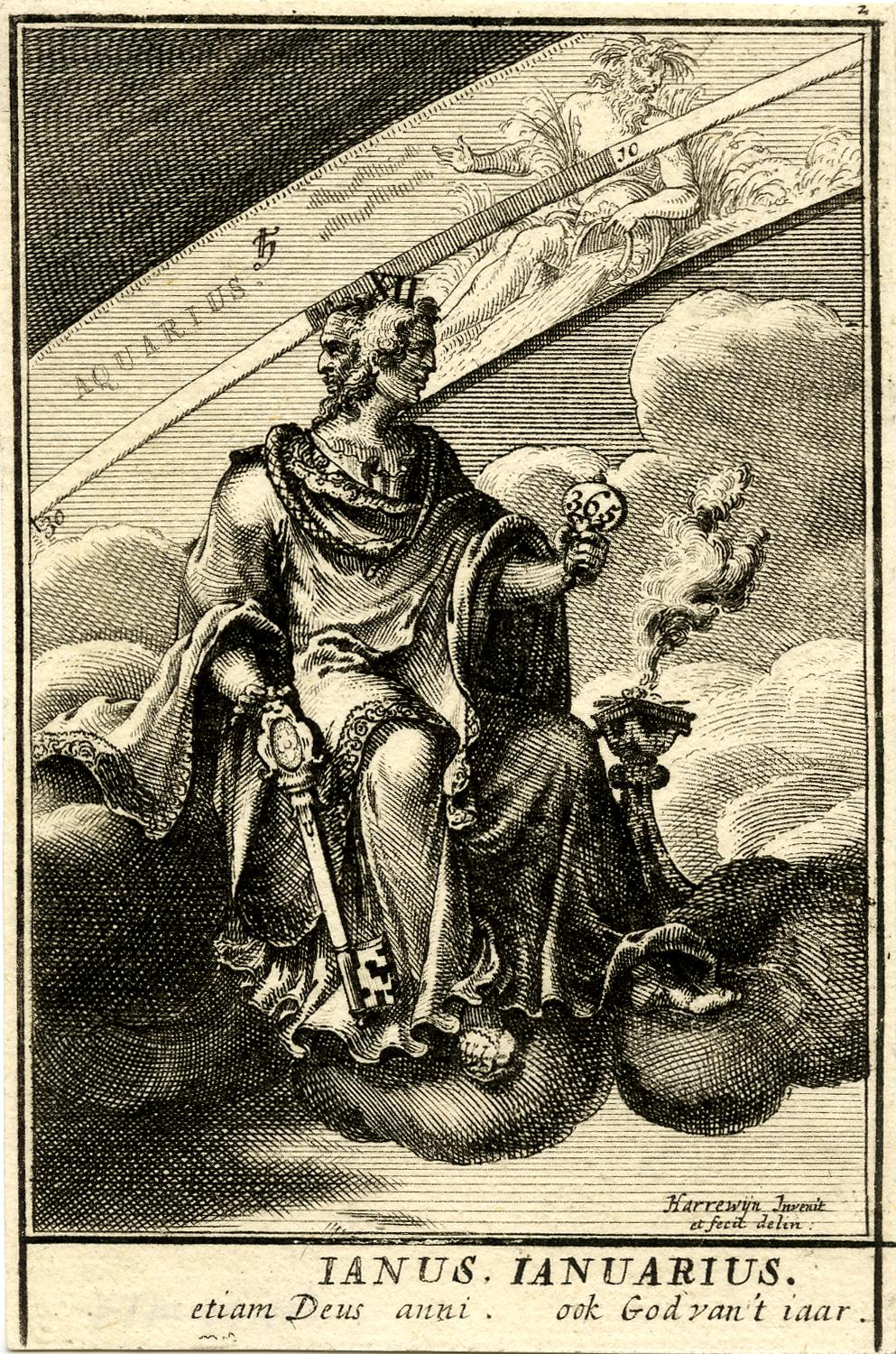
The month of January is named after Janus.

Shortly afterwards, on 9 January, on the feria of the Agonium of January, the rex sacrorum offered the sacrifice of a ram to Janus.

=== Beginning of the month ===
At the kalends of each month, the rex sacrorum and the pontifex minor offered a sacrifice to Janus in the curia Calabra, while the regina offered a sow or a she lamb to Juno.

=== Beginning of the day ===
Morning belonged to Janus: men started their daily activities and business. Horace calls him Matutine Pater, morning father. G. Dumézil believes this custom is at the origin of the learned interpretations of Janus as a solar deity.

=== Space ===
Janus was also involved in spatial transitions, presiding over home doors, city gates and boundaries. Numerous toponyms of places located at the boundary between the territory of two communities, especially Etrurians and Latins or Umbrians, are named after the god. The most notable instance is the Ianiculum which marked the access to Etruria from Rome. Since borders often coincided with rivers and the border of Rome (and other Italics) with Etruria was the Tiber, it has been argued that its crossing had a religious connotation; it would have involved a set of rigorous apotropaic practices and a devotional attitude. Janus would have originally regulated particularly the crossing of this sacred river through the pons sublicius. The name of the Iāniculum is not derived by that of the god, but from the abstract noun iānus, -us. Adams Holland opines it would have been originally the name of a small bridge connecting the Tiber Island (on which she supposes the first shrine of Janus stood) with the right bank of the river. However Janus was the protector of doors, gates and roadways in general, as is shown by his two symbols, the key and the staff. The key too was a sign that the traveller had come to a harbour or ford in peace to exchange his goods.

The rite of the bride's oiling the posts of the door of her new home with wolf fat at her arrival, though not mentioning Janus explicitly, is a rite of passage related to the ianua.

=== Rites of the Salii ===
The rites of the Salii marked the springtime beginning of the war season in March and its closing in October. The structure of the patrician sodalitas, made up by the two groups of the Salii Palatini, who were consecrated to Mars and whose institution was traditionally ascribed to Numa (with headquarter on the Palatine), and the Salii Collini or Agonales, consecrated to Quirinus and whose foundation was ascribed to Tullus Hostilius, (with headquarter on the Quirinal) reflects in its division the dialectic symbolic role they played in the rites of the opening and closing of the military season. So does the legend of their foundation itself: the peace-loving king Numa instituted the Salii of Mars Gradivus, foreseeing the future wars of the Romans while the warmonger king Tullus, in a battle during a longstanding war with the Sabines, swore to found a second group of Salii should he obtain victory.

The paradox of the pacifist king serving Mars and passage to war and of the warmonger king serving Quirinus to achieve peace under the expected conditions highlights the dialectic nature of the cooperation between the two gods, inherent to their own function. Because of the working of the talismans of the sovereign god they guaranteed alternatively force and victory, fecundity and plenty. It is noteworthy that the two groups of Salii did not split their competences so that one group only opened the way to war and the other to peace: they worked together both at the opening and the conclusion of the military season, marking the passage of power from one god to the other. Thus the Salii enacted the dialectic nature present in the warring and peaceful aspect of the Roman people, particularly the iuvenes.

This dialectic was reflected materially by the location of the temple of Mars outside the pomerium and of the temple of Quirinus inside it. The annual dialectic rhythm of the rites of the Salii of March and October was also further reflected within the rites of each month and spatially by their repeated crossing of the pomerial line. The rites of March started on the first with the ceremony of the ancilia movere, developed through the month on the 14th with Equirria in the Campus Martius (and the rite of Mamurius Veturius marking the expulsion of the old year), the 17th with the Agonium Martiale, the 19th with the Quinquatrus in the Comitium (which correspond symmetrically with the Armilustrium of 19 October), on the 23rd with the Tubilustrium and they terminated at the end of the month with the rite of the ancilia condere. Only after this month-long set of rites was accomplished was it fas to undertake military campaigns.

While Janus sometimes is named belliger and sometimes pacificus in accord with his general function of beginner, he is mentioned as Janus Quirinus in relation to the closing of the rites of March at the end of the month together with Pax, Salus and Concordia: This feature is a reflection of the aspect of Janus Quirinus which stresses the quirinal function of bringing peace back and the hope of soldiers for a victorious return.

As the rites of the Salii mimic the passage from peace to war and back to peace by moving between the two poles of Mars and Quirinus in the monthly cycle of March, so they do in the ceremonies of October, the Equus October ("October Horse") taking place on the Campus Martius the Armilustrium, purification of the arms, on the Aventine, and the Tubilustrium on the 23rd. Other correspondences may be found in the dates of the founding of the temples of Mars on 1 June and of that of Quirinus on 29 June, in the pre-Julian calendar the last day of the month, implying that the opening of the month belonged to Mars and the closing to Quirinus.

The reciprocity of the two gods' situations is subsumed under the role of opener and closer played by Janus as Ovid states: "Why are you hidden in peace, and open when the arms have been moved?" Another analogous correspondence may be found in the festival of the Quirinalia of February, last month of the ancient calendar of Numa. The rite of the opening and closure of the Janus Quirinus would thus reflect the idea of the reintegration of the miles into civil society, i.e. the community of the quirites, by playing a lustral role similar to the Tigillum Sororium and the porta triumphalis located at the south of the Campus Martius. In Augustan ideology this symbolic meaning was strongly emphasised.

=== Tigillum Sororium ===
This rite was supposed to commemorate the expiation of the murder of his own sister by Marcus Horatius. The young hero with his head veiled had to pass under a beam spanning an alley. The rite was repeated every year on 1 October. The tigillum consisted of a beam on two posts. It was kept in good condition at public expenses to the time of Livy. Behind the tigillum, on opposite sides of the alley, stood the two altars of Janus Curiatius and Juno Sororia. Its location was on the vicus leading to the Carinae, perhaps at the point of the crossing of the pomerium. The rite and myth have been interpreted by Dumezil as a purification and desacralization of the soldiers from the religious pollution contracted in war, and a freeing of the warrior from furor, wrath, as dangerous in the city as it is necessary on campaign.

The rite took place on the kalends of October, the month marking the end of the yearly military activity in ancient Rome. Scholars have offered different interpretations of the meaning of Janus Curiatius and Juno Sororia. The association of the two gods with this rite is not immediately clear. It is however apparent that they exchanged their epithets, as Curiatius is connected to (Juno) Curitis and Sororia to (Janus) Geminus. Renard thinks that while Janus is the god of motion and transitions he is not concerned directly with purification, while the arch is more associated with Juno. This fact would be testified by the epithet Sororium, shared by the tigillum and the goddess. Juno Curitis is also the protectress of the iuvenes, the young soldiers. Paul the Deacon states that the sororium tigillum was a sacer (sacred) place in honour of Juno. Another element linking Juno with Janus is her identification with Carna, suggested by the festival of this deity on the kalends (day of Juno) of June, the month of Juno.

Carna was a nymph of the sacred lucus of Helernus, made goddess of hinges by Janus with the name of Cardea, and had the power of protecting and purifying thresholds and the doorposts. This would be a further element in explaining the role of Juno in the Tigillum. It was also customary for new brides to oil the posts of the door of their new homes with wolf fat. In the myth of Janus and Carna (see section below) Carna had the habit when pursued by a young man of asking him out of shyness for a hidden recess and thereupon fleeing: but two headed Janus saw her hiding in a crag under some rocks. Thence the analogy with the rite of the Tigillum Sororium would be apparent: both in the myth and in the rite Janus, the god of motion, goes through a low passage to attain Carna as Horatius passes under the tigillum to obtain his purification and the restitution to the condition of citizen eligible for civil activities, including family life. The purification is then the prerequisite for fertility. The custom of attaining lustration and fertility by passing under a gap in rocks, a hole in the soil or a hollow in a tree is widespread.

The veiled head of Horatius could also be explained as an apotropaic device if one considers the tigillum the iugum of Juno, the feminine principle of fecundity. Renard concludes that the rite is under the tutelage of both Janus and Juno, being a rite of transition under the patronage of Janus and of desacralisation and fertility under that of Juno: through it the iuvenes coming back from campaign were restituted to their fertile condition of husbands and peasants. Janus is often associated with fecundity in myths, representing the masculine principle of motion, while Juno represents the complementary feminine principle of fertility: the action of the first would allow the manifestation of the other.

== Myths ==
In discussing myths about Janus, one should be careful in distinguishing those which are ancient and originally Latin and those others which were later attributed to him by Greek mythographers. In the Fasti Ovid relates only the myths that associate Janus with Saturn, whom he welcomed as a guest and with whom he eventually shared his kingdom in reward for teaching the art of agriculture, and to the nymph Crane, Grane, or Carna, whom Janus raped and made the goddess of hinges as Cardea, while in the Metamorphoses he records his fathering with Venilia the nymph Canens, loved by Picus, first legendary king of the Aborigines.

The myth of Crane has been studied by M. Renard and G. Dumezil. The first scholar sees in it a sort of parallel with the theology underlying the rite of the Tigillum Sororium. Crane is a nymph of the sacred wood of Helernus, located at the issue of the Tiber, whose festival of 1 February corresponded with that of Juno Sospita: Crane might be seen as a minor imago of the goddess. Her habit of deceiving her male pursuers by hiding in crags in the soil reveals her association not only with vegetation but also with rocks, caverns, and underpassages. Her nature looks to be also associated with vegetation and nurture: G. Dumezil has proved that Helernus was a god of vegetation, vegetative lushness and orchards, particularly associated with vetch. As Ovid writes in his Fasti, 1 June was the festival day of Carna, besides being the calendary festival of the month of Juno and the festival of Juno Moneta. Ovid seems to purposefully conflate and identify Carna with Cardea in the aetiologic myth related above. Consequently, the association of both Janus and the god Helernus with Carna-Crane is highlighted in this myth: it was customary on that day to eat ivetch (mashed beans) and lard, which were supposed to strengthen the body. Cardea had also magic powers for protecting doorways (by touching thresholds and posts with wet hawthorn twigs) and newborn children by the aggression of the striges (in the myth the young Proca). M. Renard sees the association of Janus with Crane as reminiscent of widespread rites of lustration and fertility performed through ritual walking under low crags or holes in the soil or natural hollows in trees, which in turn are reflected in the lustrative rite of the Tigillum Sororium.

Macrobius relates that Janus was supposed to have shared a kingdom with Camese in Latium, in a place then named Camesene. He states that Hyginus recorded the tale on the authority of a Protarchus of Tralles. In Macrobius Camese is a male: after Camese's death Janus reigned alone. However Greek authors make of Camese Janus's sister and spouse: Atheneus citing a certain Drakon of Corcyra writes that Janus fathered with his sister Camese a son named Aithex and a daughter named Olistene. Servius Danielis states Tiber (i.e., Tiberinus) was their son.

Arnobius writes that Fontus was the son of Janus and Juturna. The name itself proves that this is a secondary form of Fons modelled on Janus, denouncing the late character of this myth: it was probably conceived because of the proximity of the festivals of Juturna (11 January) and the Agonium of Janus (9 January) as well as for the presence of an altar of Fons near the Janiculum and the closeness of the notions of spring and of beginning.

Plutarch writes that according to some Janus was a Greek from Perrhebia.

After Romulus and his men kidnapped the Sabine women, and Rome was attacked by the Sabines under king Tatius, Janus caused a volcanic hot spring to erupt, resulting in the would-be attackers being buried alive in the deathly hot, brutal water and ash mixture of the rushing hot volcanic springs that killed, burned, or disfigured many of Tatius's men. This spring is called Lautolae by Varro. Later on, however, the Sabines and Romans agreed on creating a new community together. In honor of this, the doors of a walled roofless structure called 'The Janus' were kept open during war after a symbolic contingent of soldiers had marched through it. The doors were closed in ceremony when peace was concluded.

== Origin, legends, and history ==
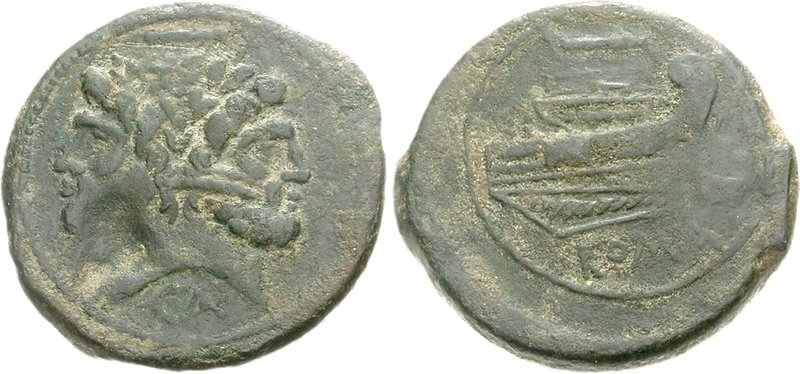
A bronze as from Canusium depicting a laureate Janus with the prow of a ship on the reverse

In accord with his fundamental character of being the Beginner, Janus was considered by Romans the first king of Latium, sometimes along with Camese. He would have received hospitably the god Saturn, who, expelled from Heaven by Jupiter, arrived on a ship to the Janiculum. Janus would have also effected the miracle of turning the waters of the spring at the foot of the Viminal from cold to scorching hot to fend off the assault of the Sabines of king Titus Tatius, come to avenge the kidnapping of their daughters by the Romans.

His temple named Janus Geminus had to stand open in times of war. It was said to have been built by king Numa Pompilius, who kept it always shut during his reign as there were no wars. After him it was closed very few times, one after the end of the first Punic War, three times under Augustus and once by Nero. It is recorded that emperor Gordianus III opened the Janus Geminus.

It is a noteworthy curiosity that the opening of the Janus was perhaps the last act connected to the ancient religion in Rome: Procopius writes that in 536, during the Gothic War, while general Belisarius was under siege in Rome, at night somebody opened the Janus Geminus stealthily, which had stayed closed since the 390 edict of Theodosius I that banned the ancient cults. Janus was faithful to his liminal role also in the marking of this last act.

=== Distant origin hypothesis ===
The uniqueness of Janus in Latium has suggested to L. Adams Holland and J. Gagé the hypothesis of a cult brought from far away by sailors and strictly linked to the amphibious life of the primitive communities living on the banks of the Tiber. In the myth of Janus, the ship of Saturn, as well as the myth of Carmenta and Evander are reminiscent of an ancient pre-Roman sailing life. The elements that seem to connect Janus to sailing are presented in two articles by J. Gagé summarised here below.

==== 1. The boat of Janus and the beliefs of the primitive sailing techniques ====
(a) The proximity of Janus and Portunus and the functions of the flamen Portunalis
The temple of Janus was dedicated by Gaius Duilius on 17 August, day of the Portunalia. The key was the symbol of both gods and was also meant to signify that the boarding boat was a peaceful merchant boat.

The flamen Portunalis oiled the arms of Quirinus with an ointment kept in a peculiar container named persillum, term perhaps derived from Etruscan persie. A similar object seems to be represented in a fresco picture of the Calendar of Ostia on which young boys prepare to apply a resin contained in a basin to a boat on a cart, i.e. yet to be launched.

(b) The Tigillum Sororium
The Tigillum Sororium would be related to a gentilician cult of wood of the Horatii, as surmised by the episodes of the pons sublicius defended by Horatius Cocles, and of the posts of the main entrance of the temple of Jupiter Capitolinus on which Marcus Horatius Pulvillus lay his hand during the dedication rite. Gagé thinks the magic power of the Tigillum Sororium should be ascribed to the lively and burgeoning nature of wood.

==== 2. Religious quality of trees ====
Trees as the wild olive, and the Greek or Italic lotus (Celtis australis), have analogous religious qualities to those of corniolum and wild fig for sailing communities: its wood does not rot in sea water, thence it was used in shipbuilding and in the making of rolls for hauling of ships overland.

==== 3. The depiction of Janus and Boreas as bifrons ====
The depiction of both Janus and Boreas as bifrons, and seasonal elements.

(a) The calendar of Numa and the role of Janus
Contradictions of the ancient Roman calendar on the beginning of the new year: originally March was the first month and February the last one. January, the month of Janus, became the first after several changes in the calendar. The liminal character of Janus is still present in the association to the Saturnalia of December, reflecting the strict relationship between the two gods Janus and Saturn and the rather blurred distinction of their stories and symbols.

The initial role of Janus in the political-religious operations of January: the nuncupatio votorum spanning the year, the imperial symbol of the boat in the opening rite of the sailing season, the vota felicia: Janus and his myths allow for an ancient interpretation of the vota felicia, different from the Isiadic one.

(b) The idea of the Seasons in the ancient traditions of the Ionian Islands
The crossing of the Hyperborean myths. Cephalonia as a place at the cross of famous winds. Application of the theory of winds for the navigation in the Ionian Sea. The type Boreas Bifrons as probable model of the Roman Janus.

This observation was made first by the Roscher Lexicon: "Ianus is he too, doubtlessly, a god of wind" Grimal has taken up this interpretation connecting it to a vase with red figures representing Boreas pursuing the nymph Oreithyia: Boreas is depicted as a two headed winged demon, the two faces with beards, one black and the other fair, perhaps symbolising the double movement of the winds Boreas and Antiboreas. This proves that the Greeks of the 5th century BC knew the image of Janus. Gagé feels compelled to mention here another parallel with Janus to be found in the figure of Argos with one hundred eyes and in his association with his murderer Hermes.

(c) Solar, solsticial and cosmological elements
While there is no direct proof of an original solar meaning of Janus, this being the issue of learned speculations of the Roman erudits initiated into the mysteries and of emperors as Domitian, the derivation from a Syrian cosmogonic deity proposed by P. Grimal looks more acceptable. Gagé though sees an ancient, preclassical Greek mythic substratum to which belong Deucalion and Pyrrha, and the Hyperborean origins of the Delphic cult of Apollo, as well as the Argonauts. The beliefs in the magic power of trees is reflected in the use of the olive wood, as for the rolls of the ship Argos: the myth of the Argonauts has links with Corcyra, remembered by Lucius Ampelius.

==== 4. The sites of the cults of Janus at Rome ====
The sites of the cults of Janus at Rome and his associations in ancient Latium.

(a) Argiletum
Varro gives either the myth of the killing of Argos as an etymology of the word Argi-letum (death of Argos), which looks to be purely fantastic, or that of place located upon a soil of clay, argilla in Latin. The place so named stood at the foot of the Viminal, the hill of the reeds. It could also be referred to the white willow tree, used to make objects of trelliswork.

(b) The Janiculum
The Janiculum may have been inhabited by people who were not Latin but had close alliances with Rome. The right bank of the Tiber would constitute a typical, convenient, commodious landing place for boats and the cult of Janus would have been double insofar as amphibious.

(c) Janus in Latium
Janus's cultic alliances and relations in Latium show a pre-Latin character. Janus has no association in cult (calendar or prayer formulae) with any other entity. Even though he bears the epithet of Pater he is not head of a divine family; however some testimonies lend him a companion, sometimes female, and a son and / or a daughter. They belong to the family of the nymphs or genies of springs. Janus intervenes in the miracle of the hot spring during the battle between Romulus and Tatius: Juturna and the nymphs of the springs are clearly related to Janus as well as Venus, that in Ovid's Metamorphoses cooperates in the miracle and may have been confused with Venilia, or perhaps the two might have been originally one.

Janus has a direct link only to Venilia, with whom he fathered Canens. The magic role of the wild olive tree (oleaster) is prominent in the description of the duel between Aeneas and Turnus reflecting its religious significance and powers: it was sacred to sailors, also those who had shipwrecked as a protecting guide to the shore. It was probably venerated by a Prelatin culture in association with Faunus.

In the story of Venulus coming back from Apulia too one may see the religious connotation of the wild olive: the king discovers one into which a local shepherd had been turned for failing to respect the nymphs he had come across in a nearby cavern, apparently Venilia, who was the deity associated with the magic virtues of such tree.

Gagé finds it remarkable that the characters related to Janus are in the Aeneis on the side of the Rutuli. In the poem Janus would be represented by Tiberinus. Olistene, the daughter of Janus with Camese, may reflect in her name that of the olive or oleaster, or of Oreithyia. Camese may be reflected in Carmenta: Evander's mother is from Arcadia, comes to Latium as an exile migrant and has her two festivals in January: Camese's name at any rate does not look Latin.

==== 5. Sociological remarks ====
(a) The vagueness of Janus's association with the cults of primitive Latium
The vagueness of Janus's association with the cults of primitive Latium and his indifference towards the social composition of the Roman State suggest that he was a god of an earlier amphibious merchant society in which the role of the guardian god was indispensable.

(b) Janus bifrons and the Penates
Even though the cult of Janus cannot be confused with that of the Penates, related with Dardanian migrants from Troy, the binary nature of the Penates and of Janus postulates a correspondent ethnic or social organisation. Here the model is thought to be provided by the cult of the Magni Dei or Cabeiri preserved at Samothrace and worshipped particularly among sailing merchants.

The aetiological myth is noteworthy too: at the beginning one finds Dardanos and his brother Iasios appearing as auxiliary figures in a Phrygian cult to a Great Mother.

In Italy there is a trace of a conflict between worshippers of the Argive Hera (Diomedes and the Diomedians of the south) and of the Penates. The cult of Janus looks to be related to social groups remained at the fringe of the Phrygian ones. They might or might not have been related to the cult of the Dioscuri.

== Relationship with other gods ==
=== Janus and Juno ===
The relationship between Janus and Juno is defined by the closeness of the notions of beginning and transition and the functions of conception and delivery. The reader is referred to the above sections Cult epithets and Tigillum Sororium of this article and the corresponding section of article Juno.

=== Janus and Quirinus ===
Quirinus is a god that incarnates the quirites, i.e. the Romans in their civil capacity of producers and fathers. He is surnamed Mars tranquillus (peaceful Mars), Mars qui praeest paci (Mars who presides on peace). His function of custos guardian is highlighted by the location of his temple inside the pomerium but not far from the gate of Porta Collina or Quirinalis, near the shrines of Sancus and Salus.

As a protector of peace he is nevertheless armed, in the same way as the quirites are, as they are potentially milites soldiers: his statue represents him is holding a spear. For this reason Janus, god of gates, is concerned with his function of protector of the civil community. For the same reason the flamen Portunalis oiled the arms of Quirinus, implying that they were to be kept in good order and ready even though they were not to be used immediately.

Dumézil and Schilling remark that as a god of the third function Quirinus is peaceful and represents the ideal of the pax romana i. e. a peace resting on victory.

=== Janus and Portunus ===
Portunus may be defined as a sort of duplication inside the scope of the powers and attributes of Janus. His original definition shows he was the god of gates and doors and of harbours. In fact it is debated whether his original function was only that of god of gates and the function of god of harbours was a later addition: Paul the Deacon writes:

"... he is depicted holding a key in his hand and was thought to be the god of gates".

Varro would have stated that he was the god of harbours and patron of gates. His festival day named Portunalia fell on 17 August, and he was venerated on that day in a temple ad pontem Aemilium and ad pontem Sublicium that had been dedicated on that date.

Portunus, unlike Janus, had his own flamen, named Portunalis. It is noteworthy that the temple of Janus in the Forum Holitorium had been consecrated on the day of the Portunalia, and that the flamen Portunalis was in charge of oiling the arms of the statue of Quirinus.

=== Janus and Vesta ===
The relationship between Janus and Vesta touches on the question of the nature and function of the gods of beginning and ending in Indo-European religion. While Janus has the first place, Vesta has the last, both in theology and in ritual (Ianus primus, Vesta extrema).

The last place implies a direct connection with the situation of the worshipper, in space and in time. Vesta is thence the goddess of the hearth of homes as well as of the city. Her inextinguishable fire is a means for men (as individuals and as a community) to keep in touch with the realm of gods. Thus there is a reciprocal link between the god of beginnings and unending motion, who bestows life to the beings of this world (Cerus Manus) as well as presiding over its end, and the goddess of the hearth of man, which symbolises through fire the presence of life. Vesta is a virgin goddess, but at the same time she is called a 'mother' of Rome: She is thought to be indispensable to the existence and survival of the community.

== Janus in Etruria ==
It has long been believed that Janus was present among the theonyms on the outer rim of the Piacenza Liver in case 3, under the name of Aaron. This fact created a problem as the god of beginnings looked to be located in a situation other than the initial, i.e. the first case. After the new readings proposed by A. Maggiani, in case 3 one should read TINS: the difficulty has thus dissolved. Aaron has thence been eliminated from Franciscan theology as this was his only attestation. Maggiani remarks that this earlier identification was in contradiction with the testimony ascribed to Varro by Johannes Lydus that Janus was named caelum among the Etruscans.

On the other hand, as expected Janus is present in region I of Martianus Capella's division of Heaven and in region XVI, the last one, are to be found the Ianitores terrestres (along with Nocturnus), perhaps to be identified in Forculus, Limentinus and Cardea, deities strictly related to Janus as his auxiliaries (or perhaps even no more than concrete subdivisions of his functions) as the meaning of their names implies: Forculus is the god of the forca, a iugum, low passage, Limentinus the guardian of the limes, boundary, Cardea the goddess of hinges, here of the gates separating Earth and Heaven.

The problem posed by the qualifying adjective terrestres earthly, can be addressed in two different ways. One hypothesis is that Martianus's depiction implies a descent from Heaven onto Earth. However Martianus's depiction does not look to be confined to a division Heaven-Earth as it includes the Underworld and other obscure regions or remote recesses of Heaven. Thence one may argue that the articulation Ianus-Ianitores could be interpreted as connected to the idea of the Gates of Heaven (the Synplegades) which open on the Heaven on one side and on Earth or the Underworld on the other.

From other archaeological documents though it has become clear that the Etruscans had another god who was double-faced like Janus: Culśanś, of which there is a bronze statuette from Cortona (now at Cortona Museum). While Janus is a bearded adult, Culśans is an unbearded youth, making his identification with Hermes look possible. However, his name is also connected with the Etruscan word for doors and gates.

According to Capdeville, Culśans may also be found on the outer rim of the Piacenza Liver, on case 14, in the compound form CULALP, i.e., "of Culśans and of Alpan(u)" on the authority of Pfiffig, but perhaps here it indicates instead the female goddess Culśu, the guardian of the door of the Underworld. Although the location is not strictly identical, there is some approximation in his situations on the Liver and in Martianus's system.

A. Audin connects the figure of Janus to Culśans and Turms (Etruscan rendering of Hermes, the Greek god mediator between the different worlds, brought by the Etruscan from the Aegean Sea), considering these last two Etruscan deities as the same. This interpretation would then identify Janus with Greek god Hermes. Etruscan medals from Volterra too show the double-headed god and the Janus Quadrifrons from Falerii may have an Etruscan origin.

== Association with non-Roman gods ==
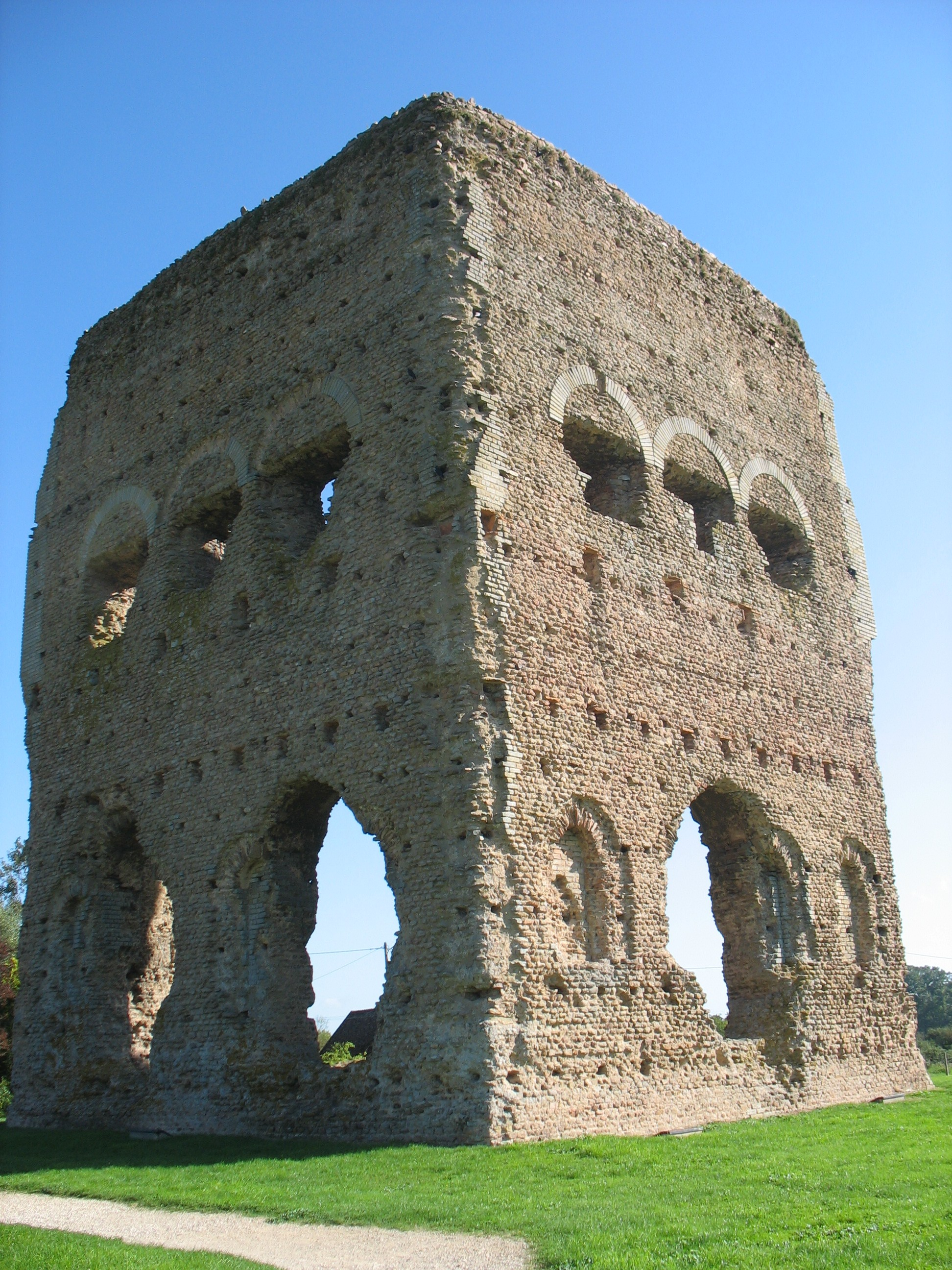
The traditional ascription of the "Temple of Janus" at Autun, Burgundy, is disputed.

Roman and Greek authors maintained Janus was an exclusively Roman god. This claim is excessive according to R. Schilling, at least as far as iconography is concerned. A god with two faces appears repeatedly in Sumerian and Babylonian art.

The ancient Sumerian deity Isimud was commonly portrayed with two faces facing in opposite directions. Sumerian depictions of Isimud are often very similar to the typical portrayals of Janus in ancient Roman art. Unlike Janus, however, Isimud is not a god of doorways. Instead, he is the messenger of Enki, the ancient Sumerian god of water and civilization. Reproductions of the image of Isimud, whose Babylonian name was Usimu, on cylinders in Sumero-Accadic art can to be found in H. Frankfort's work Cylinder seals (London 1939) especially in plates at p. 106, 123, 132, 133, 137, 165, 245, 247, 254. On plate XXI, c, Usimu is seen while introducing worshippers to a seated god.

Janus-like heads of gods related to Hermes have been found in Greece, perhaps suggesting a compound god.

William Betham argued that the cult arrived from the Middle East and that Janus corresponds to the Baal-ianus or Belinus of the Chaldeans, sharing a common origin with the Oannes of Berosus.

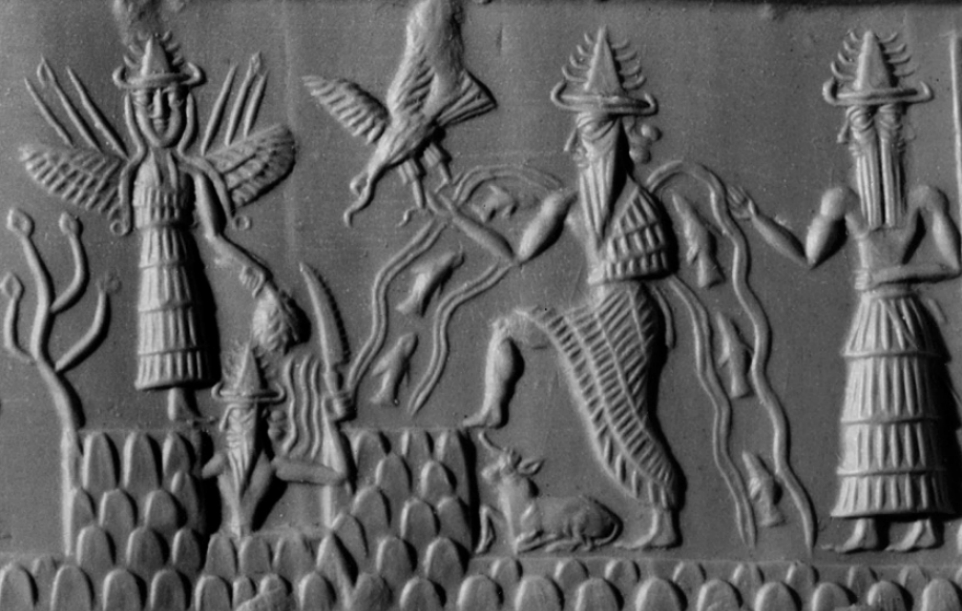
A cylinder seal depicting the gods Ishtar, Shamash, Enki, and Isimud, who is shown with two faces (circa 2300 BC)

P. Grimal considers Janus a conflation of a Roman god of doorways and an ancient Syro-Hittite uranic cosmogonic god.

The Roman statue of the Janus of the Argiletum, traditionally ascribed to Numa, was possibly very ancient, perhaps a sort of xoanon, like the Greek ones of the 8th century BC.

Other analogous or comparable deities of the prima in Indo-European religions have been analysed by G. Dumézil. They include the Indian goddess Aditi who is called two-faced as she is the one who starts and concludes ceremonies, and Scandinavian god Heimdallr. The theological features of Heimdallr look similar to Janus's: both in space and time he stands at the limits. His abode is at the limits of Earth, at the extremity of Heaven; he is the protector of the gods; his birth is at the beginning of time; he is the forefather of mankind, the generator of classes and the founder of the social order. Nonetheless he is inferior to the sovereign god Oðinn: the Minor Völuspá defines his relationship to Oðinn almost with the same terms as those in which Varro defines that of Janus, god of the prima to Jupiter, god of the summa: Heimdallr is born as the firstborn (primigenius, var einn borinn í árdaga), Oðinn is born as the greatest (maximus, var einn borinn öllum meiri). Analogous Iranian formulae are to be found in an Avestic gāthā (Gathas). In other towns of ancient Latium the function of presiding over beginnings was probably performed by other deities of feminine sex, notably the Fortuna Primigenia of Praeneste.

== Legacy ==
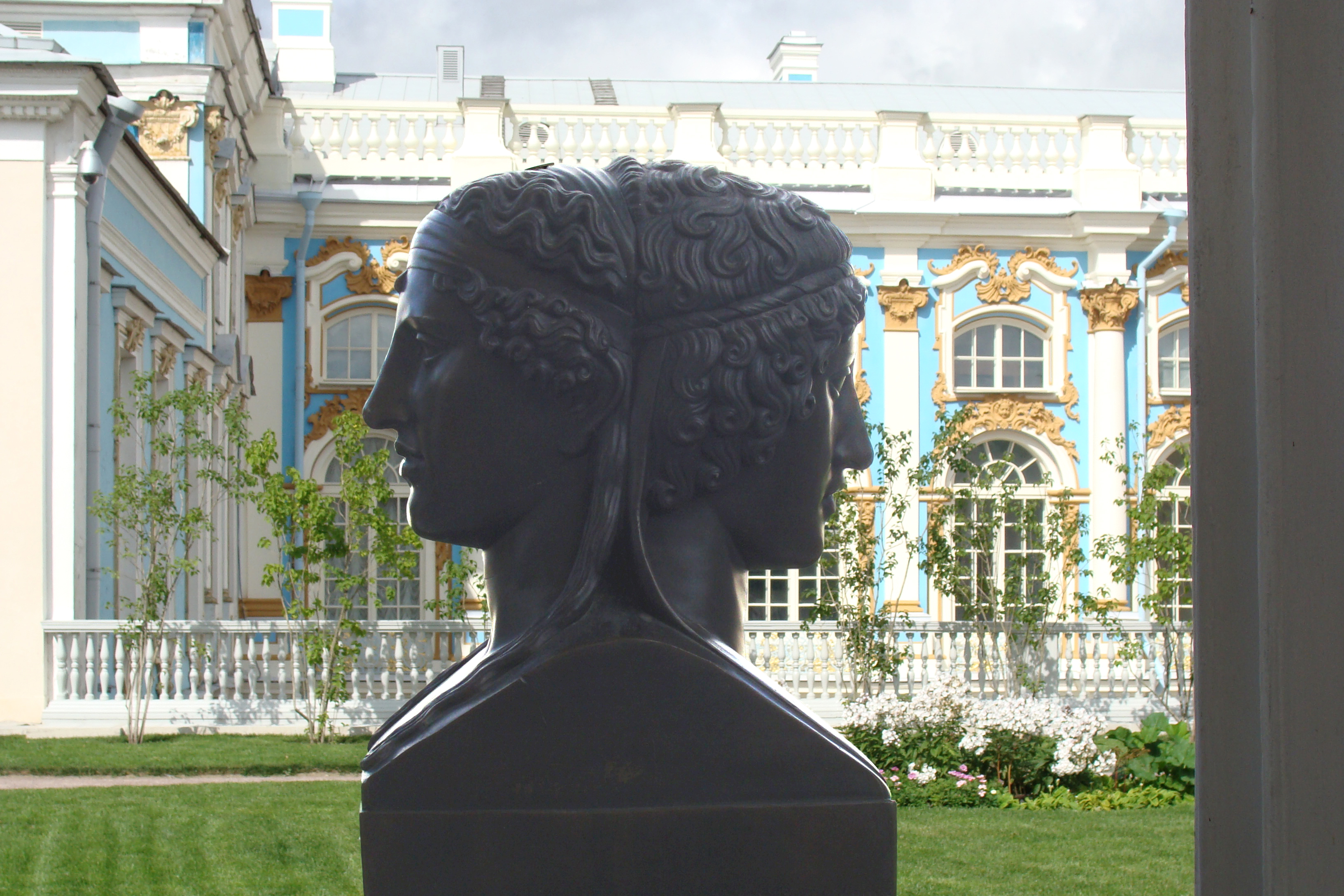
The bust of Ianus Bifrons at Cameron's Gallery, Tsarskoye Selo; fot. Ivonna Nowicka

In the Middle Ages, Janus was taken as the symbol of Genoa, whose Medieval Latin name was Ianua, as well as of other European communes. The comune of Selvazzano di Dentro near Padua has a grove and an altar of Janus depicted on its standard, but their existence is unproved. In medieval art, Janus was still sometimes depicted as the embodiment of time. In some artwork, a third face was added between the forward- and rear-looking ones to symbolize the present in addition to the past and future.

In demonology, Janus is corrupted into Bifrons, and is described by grimoires such as The Lesser Key of Solomon as a demonic earl in charge of moving bodies into graves and lighting candles over them, possibly suggesting the retention of Janus's role as a deity of endings and guardian of passages.

In Act I Scene 1 of Shakespeare's Merchant of Venice, Salarino refers to the two-headed Janus while failing to find the reason of Antonio's melancholy. In Act I Scene 2 of Shakespeare's Othello, Iago invokes the name of Janus after the failure of his plot against the titular character.

In her 1921 book The Witch-Cult in Western Europe, folklorist Margaret Murray claimed that evidence found in records of the early modern witch trials showed the witches' god, usually identified in the records as the Devil, was in fact often a male priest dressed in a double mask representing Janus. Murray traced the presence of a man dressed with a mask on the back of his head at some witch meetings to confessions of accused witches in the Pyrenees region, and one statement in particular that the leader of the witches appeared "comme le dieu Janus" ("as the god Janus"). Via the etymology given by James Frazier, Murray further connected the figure on Janus or Dianus in the witch-cult with the more well known goddess of witchcraft, Diana. Both Murray's contemporaries and modern scholars have argued that Murray's hypothesis and the connections she drew between Janus and Diana, and linking the early modern witch trials with ancient pagan beliefs, are dubious.

Janus Films, a film distribution company founded in 1956, takes its name from the god and features a two-faced Janus as its logo.

The Janus Society was an early homophile organization founded in 1962 and based in Philadelphia. It is notable as the publisher of DRUM magazine, one of the earliest gay-interest publications in the United States and most widely circulated in the 1960s, and for its role in organizing many of the nation's earliest gay rights demonstrations. The organization focused on a policy of militant respectability, a strategy demanding respect by showing the public gay individuals conforming to hetero-normative standards of dress at protests.

The Society of Janus is the second BDSM organization founded in the United States (after The Eulenspiegel Society), and is a San Francisco, California based BDSM education and support group. It was founded in August 1974 by the late Cynthia Slater and Larry Olsen. According to the Leather Hall of Fame biography of Slater, she said of the Society of Janus:

There were three basic reasons why we chose Janus. First of all, Janus has two faces, which we interpreted as the duality of SM (one's dominant and submissive sides). Second, he's the Roman god of portals, and more importantly, of beginnings and endings. To us, it represents the beginning of one's acceptance of self, the beginning of freedom from guilt, and the eventual ending of self-loathing and fear over one's SM desires. And third, Janus is the Roman god of war—the war we fight against stereotypes commonly held against us.

In the 1987 thriller novel The Janus Man by British novelist Raymond Harold Sawkins, Janus is used as a metaphor for a Soviet agent infiltrated into British Secret Intelligence Service – "The Janus Man who faces both East and West".

In the 1995 spy film GoldenEye in the James Bond film series, the main antagonist Alec Trevelyan calls himself the code name "Janus" after he betrays Bond and subsequently MI6 after learning he is a Lienz Cossack. Bond, portrayed by Pierce Brosnan, goes on to state, "Hence, Janus. The two-faced Roman god come to life", after learning of Trevelyan's betrayal.

The University of Maryland's undergraduate history journal, created in 2000, is named Janus.

Cats with the congenital disorder diprosopus, which causes the face to be partly or completely duplicated on the head, are known as Janus cats.

In the 1995 game, Chrono Trigger, Janus is the young prince of Zeal Kingdom and later becomes the Demon King Magus.

In 2020, the character Deceit from the series Sanders Sides, created by Thomas Sanders, revealed his name to be Janus in the episode "Putting Others First".

In Cassandra Clare's The Shadowhunter Chronicles, the counterpart of Jace Herondale from an alternate dimension called Thule chooses the name "Janus" for himself after the Roman god.

Janus particles are engineered micro- or nano-scopic particles possessing two distinct faces which have distinct physical or chemical properties.

Janus is the name of a time-reversible programming language. It is also the name of a concurrent constraint programming language.

William Janus is a minor character in the American sitcom South Park who has dissociative identity disorder; his surname is derived from the Roman god.

== See also ==
- Janas
- Jana
- Janus-faced molecule
- Door god
- List of Roman deities
- Janus particles
- Castor and Pollux
- Nio
- A-un
- Gozu and Mezu
- Lugal-irra and Meslamta-ea
- Dōsojin
- Janus (time-reversible computing programming language)
- Janus (concurrent constraint programming language)

== Bibliography ==
- de Vaan, Michiel (2008). Etymological Dictionary of Latin and the other Italic Languages. Brill. ISBN 9789004167971.
- Dumézil, Georges (2001). La religione romana arcaica. Milan: Rizzoli. p. 291. ISBN 978-88-17-86637-8.
- Ferrari, Anna (2001). Dizionario di mitologia greca e latina. Milan: Rizzoli. ISBN 978-88-17-86637-8.
