= Venilia =

Roman nymph and goddess of marine winds

Venilia (pronounced /vəˈnɪliə/, or as Latin Venīlia) is a Roman deity associated with the winds and the sea. According to Virgil and Ovid, she was a nymph, the sister of Amata and the wife of Janus (or Faunus), with whom she had three children: Turnus, Juturna, and Canens.

She and Salacia are the paredrae of Neptune.

The Venilia Mons, a mountain on Venus, is named for her.

== See also ==
- Pantoporia venilia, a butterfly of the family Nymphalidae
- Terebra venilia, a species of sea snail
