= USS Portunus (AGP-4) =

Tender of the United States Navy

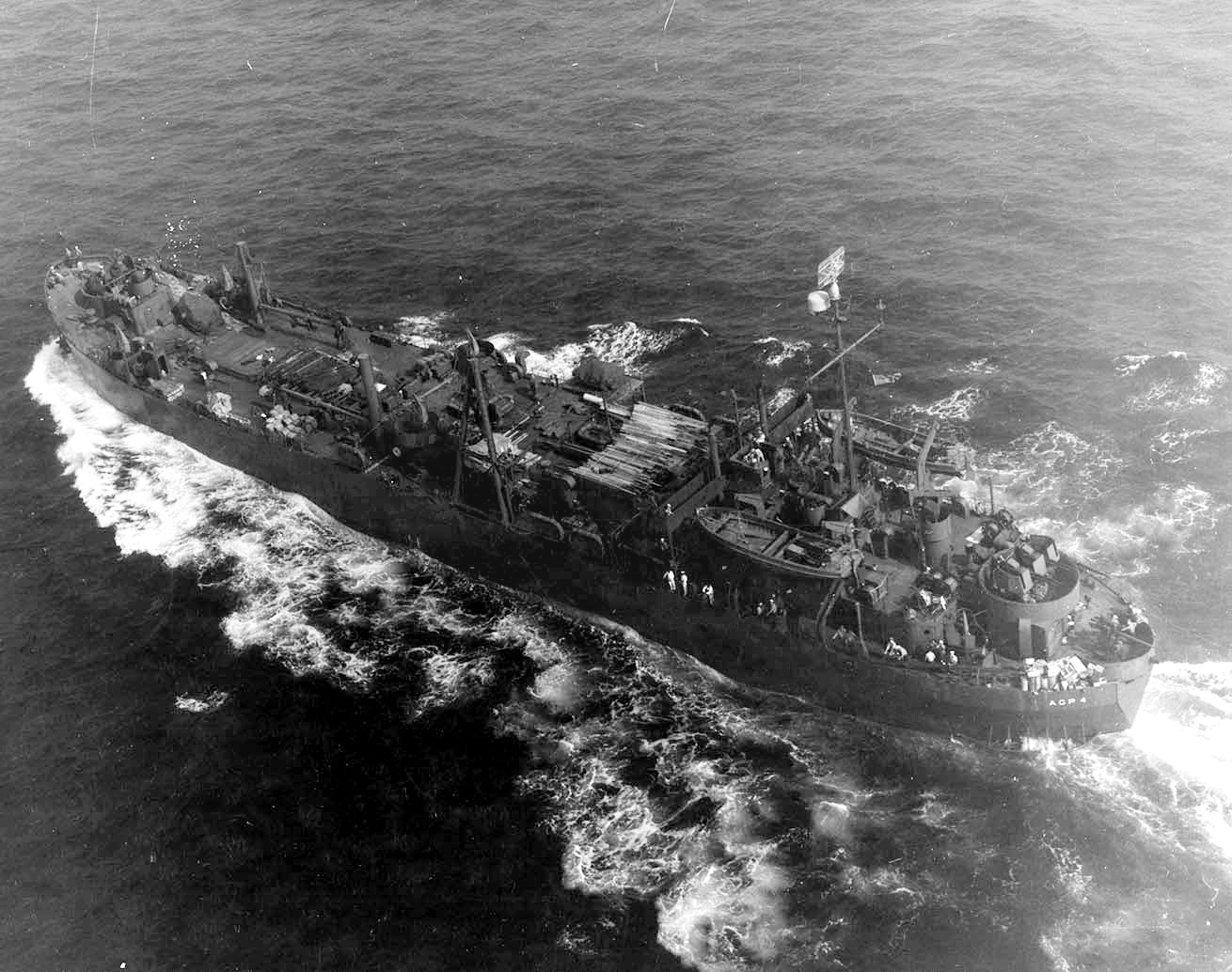
- Portunus underway off Norfolk, Virginia, 23 July 1943

History

United States
- Name: USS Portunus (AGP-4)
- Ordered: as LST-330
- Builder: Philadelphia Naval Shipyard
- Laid down: 12 November 1942
- Launched: 11 February 1943
- Commissioned: 12 June 1943
- Decommissioned: 18 April 1946
- Stricken: 13 November 1946
- Honors and awards: 3 battle stars (WWII)
- Fate: Sold for scrapping, 6 February 1948

General characteristics
- Class & type: LST-1-class tank landing ship
- Displacement: 3,960 long tons (4,024 t) full
- Length: 328 ft 0 in (99.97 m)
- Beam: 50 ft 0 in (15.24 m)
- Draft: 13 ft 6 in (4.11 m)
- Speed: 12 knots (22 km/h; 14 mph)
- Complement: 283
- Armament: 2 × single 3"/50 caliber gun mounts; 8 × 40 mm gun mounts; 8 × 20 mm guns gun mounts

USS Portunus (AGP-4) was an LST-1-class tank landing ship acquired by the United States Navy for use during World War II as a motor torpedo boat (MTB) tender. She was named after a Roman god of the sea, who had jurisdiction over ports and the shores.

Portunus was laid down as LST-330 by the Philadelphia Naval Shipyard, 12 November 1942; launched 11 February 1943 as Portunus (AGP-4); and commissioned at Baltimore, Maryland, 12 June 1943.

== World War II Pacific Theatre operations ==
After shakedown along the East Coast of the United States, this motor torpedo boat tender departed the U.S. 23 July 1943 in task group TG 29.6 for the Panama Canal, whence she continued to Australia. At Cairns, 10 October, she loaded PT Base 4 gear for transport to Kana Kope, New Guinea. On the 20th she arrived at Buna, New Guinea, and until 4 July 1944 repaired and serviced U.S. and Australian naval units operating along the New Guinea coast.

Underway 4 July in convoy with USS Hilo (AGP-2) and 8 units of MTB Squadron 25, Portunus arrived at Mios Woendi in the Schoutens 9 July. Through December, she underwent overhaul at Brisbane, Australia, and on 29 January 1945 returned to Mios Woendi and resumed repair work.

=== Invasion of the Philippines ===
On 20 February she got underway for Leyte Island, whence she proceeded to Ilo Ilo, Panay, to support MTB Ron 33 during the assault there and to establish a patrol base after its success. The assault waves met no apparent opposition, the enemy having set fires and demolition charges and evacuated the city.

=== Okinawa operations ===
On 2 April Portunus got underway for Samar and Leyte. On 16 April she joined company with the remainder of TG 78.2 to land the 24th Infantry Division, United States Army and secure Parang, Mindanao. She steamed between various points on Mindanao and Samar, supplying MTB's, until 16 July when she got underway in convoy for Okinawa. She anchored off Hagushi, 21 July and shifted to Togouchi Harbor the next day. She serviced and repaired MTB Ron 31 and 37 and various other units through 29 September when she prepared to get underway for California and inactivation.

== Post-war decommissioning ==
Decommissioned at Mare Island, California, 18 April 1946, she was struck from the Navy List 13 November 1946, transferred to the United States Maritime Commission 6 February 1948 and simultaneously delivered to the Kaiser Co., Oakland, California, for scrapping.

== Military awards and honors ==
Portunus earned 3 battle stars for World War II service

- American Campaign Medal
- Philippines Presidential Unit Citation
- Navy Occupation Service Medal (with Asia clasp)
- World War II Victory Medal
- Asiatic-Pacific Campaign Medal (3)
- Philippines Liberation Medal
