= Canens (mythology) =

Roman personification of song

In Roman mythology, Canens was the personification of song. A nymph from Latium, she was the daughter of Janus and Venilia.

Because Canens' husband Picus scorned the love of the witch Circe, she turned him into a woodpecker. Canens searched for her husband for six days and then threw herself into the Tiber river. She sang one final song and then died. They had one son, Faunus.

== Sources ==
- Ovid Metamorphoses 14.320-434
