= Selvans =

Etruscan god of boundaries

- God of boundaries
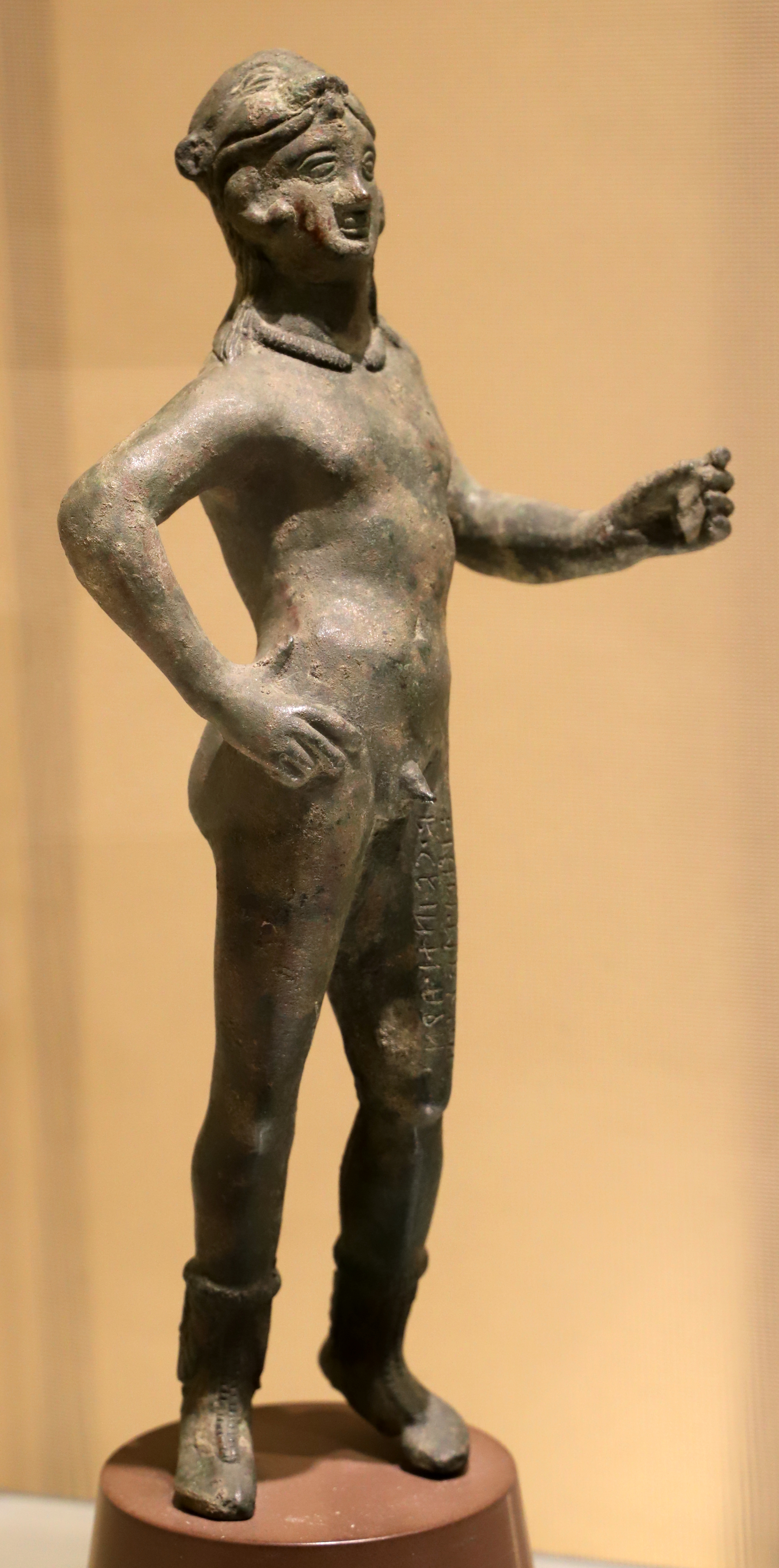
- Bronze Selvans statuette in Museo dell'Accademia Etrusca, Cortona, IT
- Etruscan: 𐌔𐌄𐌋𐌅𐌀

In Etruscan mythology and religion, Selvans is god of the woodlands and boundaries, including sacred boundaries.

He is possibly cognate with Roman Silvanus. A dedication of a statue refers to him as Selvans Tularia (Selvans of the bounderies). On a probable boundary stone from Bosnia he is referred to by the epithet Selvans Sanchuneta. This may connect him to Sancus, the Italic god of sacred oaths. His name is 10th on the list of 16 gods on the outer rim of the Piacenza Liver (a bronze model of a sheep’s liver used as a reference or teaching tool for divination). Votive inscriptions from the liver show that he was a popular god in Etruria.

Only one certain representation of Selvans has been found, alongside a statue of Culśanś. He is portrayed as a naked youth wearing a cap made of a bear’s or a cat's hide and high boots. This contrasts from the Roman Silvanus, who is usually shown as a bearded man.

== See also ==
- Etruscan civilization
- Etruscan religion
- Culśanś
