= Janus (surname) =

Janus is a surname. Notable persons with the surname include:

- Ed Janus (born 1945), American baseball and beer promoter
- Goran Janus (born 1970), Yugoslav and Slovenian ski jumper
- Jadwiga Janus (1931–2019), Polish sculptor
- Jill Janus (1975–2018), American heavy metal singer
- Joseph Janus (born 1969), American advertising executive and businessman
- Krzysztof Janus (born 1986), Polish footballer
- Marjan Janus (born 1952), Dutch swimmer
- Mark Janus, American plaintiff
- Martin Janus (1620–1682), German church musician, minister, hymn-writer
- Michael Janus, American politician
- Patricia Janus (1932–2006), American poet, artist, and educator
- Paul Janus (born 1975), American football player
- Samantha Janus (born 1972), English actress
- Samuel Janus (born 1930), American psychotherapist
- Stefan Janus (1910–1978), Polish flying ace
- Tim Janus (born 1976), American competitive eater

== See also ==
- Januš
- Hugh Janus, a gag name
