= Janas =

Janas is a surname. Notable people with the surname include:

- John Janas (1910–1969), American politician
- Piotr Janas (born 1970), Polish artist
- Paweł Janas (born 1953), Polish footballer and manager
- Robert Janás
- Lorelei Lee (born Amy Janas, 1982), American wrestler

== See also ==
- Janus (surname)
