= Culsans =

Etruscan deity

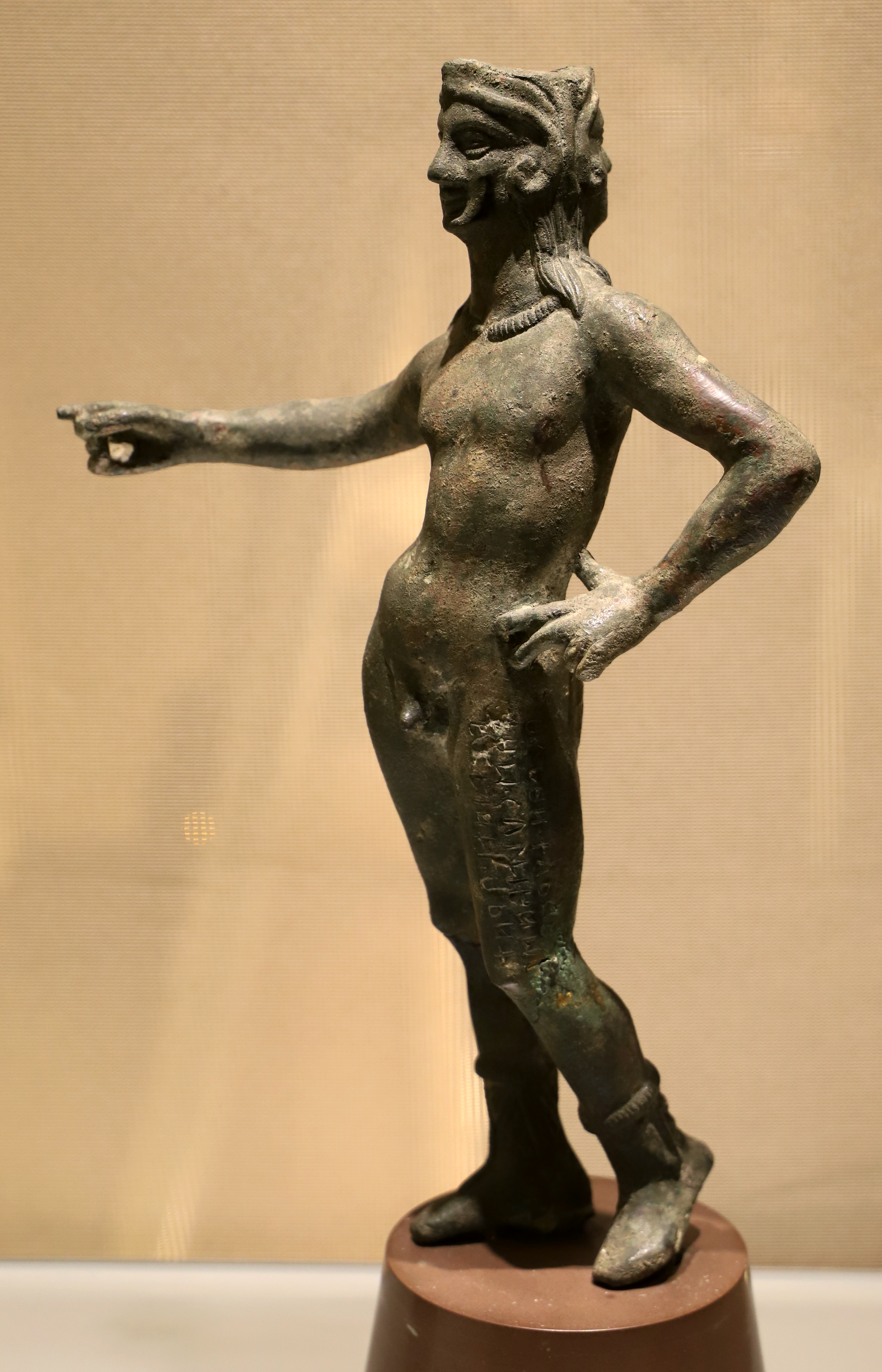
Bronze statuette of Culsans, ca. 300–250 BCE, with inscription along left thigh (Museo dell’Accademia Etrusca, Cortona)

Culsans (Culśanś) is an Etruscan deity, known from four inscriptions (Note: Rix and Meiser (2014) [1991]: Co 3.4 Co 4.11 (culśanśl; culśanś[). Vs. 3.6, Pa 4.3 (cvlsansl).) and a variety of iconographical material which includes coins, statuettes, and a sarcophagus. Culśanś is usually rendered as a male deity with two faces and at least two statuettes depicting him have been found in close association with city gates. These characteristics suggest that he was a protector of gateways, who could watch over the gate with two pairs of eyes.

Many scholars recognize the deity Janus as a Roman equivalent to Culśanś because he is also rendered as a bifrōns (two-faced god) and his divine realm also includes the protection of doorways and gates. Building on this idea, some scholars have proposed that the name Culśanś may contain an etymological root meaning “door” in Etruscan, just as Janus's name comes from the Latin word for door, ianua. The Etruscan goddess Culśu, whose name shares the same etymological root as Culśanś, is also associated with gateways, though in her case, they are gateways of the netherworld.

== Etymology ==
The theonym Culsans is evidently formed from culs* ("gate"; genitive singular culsl (Note: Attested in the inscription Ta 1.17.)) and Italian suffix -ano. (Note: In the style of Silvanus=silva + same suffix.)

== Iconographical evidence ==
For the most part, iconography of Culśanś is geographically limited to Northern Etruria and chronologically limited to the 3rd and 2nd centuries BCE of the Hellenistic Period. Many of the artifacts associated with Culśanś, come from the city of Cortona, suggesting that he had a particularly important presence there. His rendering on coins from Volterra and his inclusion in a dedicatory inscription found in Firenzuola, however, preclude the notion that his worship was limited to Cortona.

== Appearance ==
Not all renderings of Culśanś are the same, but based on the available evidence, he is most often represented as a youthful, beardless deity with two faces, wearing nothing but a pair of rustic boots and a cap. This rendering of Culśanś is best represented by a bronze statuette from Cortona which dates to the 3rd or 2nd century BCE. In this statuette, he is shown nude, in a contrapposto stance with one hand on his hip. Some scholars think that his right hand originally held a rustic staff akin to the one often held by Roman Janus, while others propose that it would have held a key, an appropriate attribute for a gatekeeper and one that was also associated with images of Janus. In addition to his rustic boots, and the flat cap that stretches over both of his heads, he also wears a torque necklace.

The statuette is clearly identified by an inscription, running up the statue's left thigh, which translates to: “Velia Cuinti, Arnt’s (daughter) to Culśanś (this object) gladly gave.” It was found buried near the north gate in Cortona together with a similar statuette representing and dedicated to the god Selvans. Selvans is rendered in a very similar manner to Culśanś; he too takes a contrapposto stance with one arm akimbo and his other arm extended to hold something. He is also naked except for his boots, a torque and a cap, and he bears a similar inscription from the same dedicator (Velia Cuinti). Ingrid Krauskopf points out that since the two figures both wear boots and a torque in common, these items are not likely special clothing, characteristic of either god in particular.

The two Cortona figures are different in that Selvans only has one face and wears a different style cap which seems to be made from an animal skin of some sort, possibly from a lion or a wolf. Selvans is equated by some scholars to the Roman god Silvanus. Selvans, like Culśanś is probably a god who protected boundaries, liminal spaces, gates and doorways.

Another noteworthy aspect of these two Cortona figures is the way their hands, and especially, their fingers are positioned. There is a passage by the Roman author Pliny the Elder in which he describes a statue of Janus where his fingers are positioned to represent the 365 (CCCLXV) days of the year. This has led many scholars to consider whether the finger positions of the Cortona statuettes may also be significant. If the finger positions were meant to render a number value related to the calendar, it could suggest that Culśanś had an association with time and the cycle of the year just like Janus.

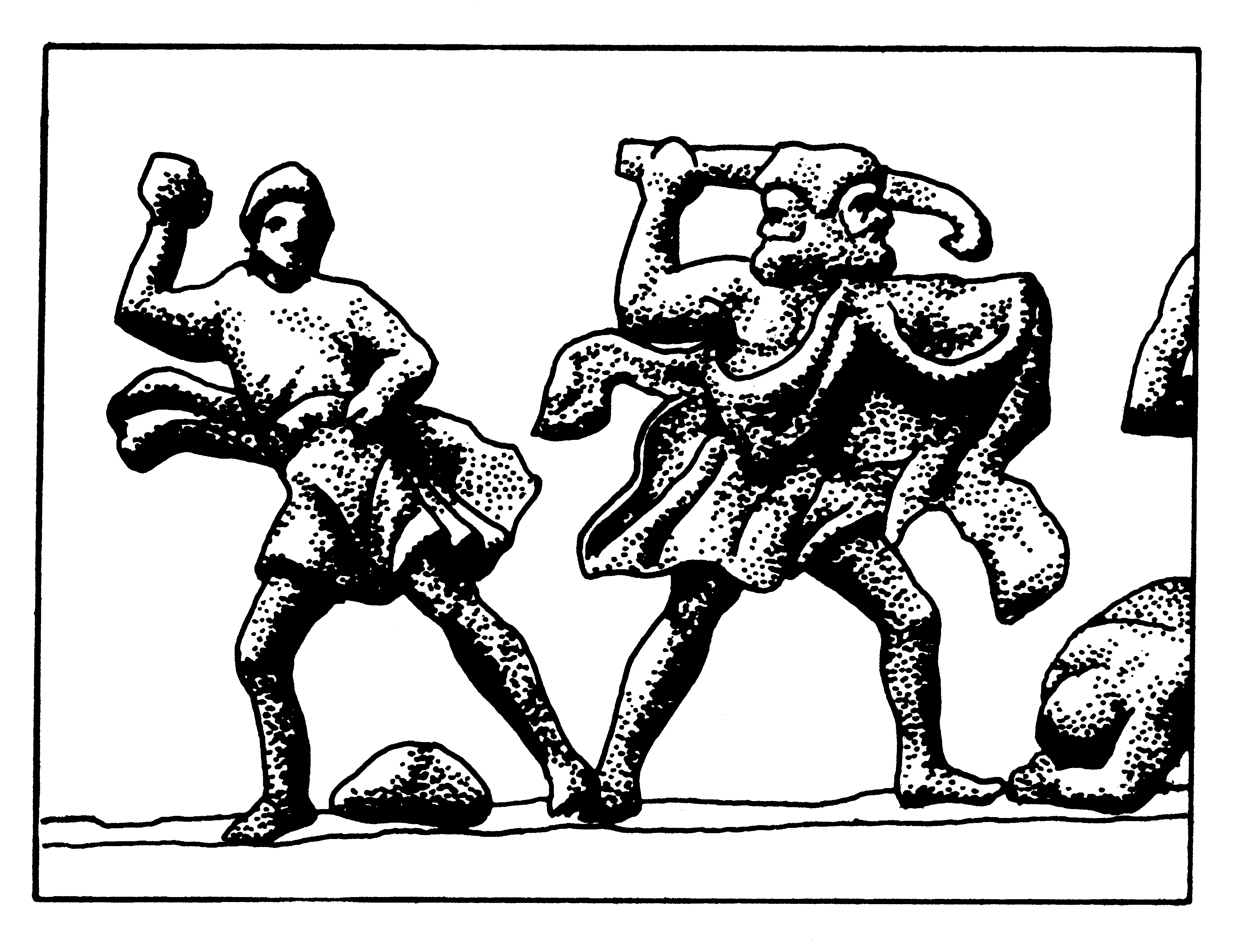
Stone sarcophagus from Tuscania. Tuscania, Museo Archeologico, ca. 300 BCE. Showing a bifrons, probably Culśanś, in battle.

The typical portrayal of Culśanś and Selvans as beardless youths exemplified by these Cortona figures stands in contrast to renderings of their Roman counterparts, Janus and Silvanus, who are usually shown as bearded, older men. Three coins from Volterra, all dating to the 3rd or 2nd c. BCE, also depict Culśanś as a youthful, beardless bifrons.

Krauskopf includes a 2nd c. BCE terracotta bust from Vulci of a double-faced bearded figure on her list of possible representations of Culśanś. This figure is more easily likened to representations of Janus, but some scholars have questioned the bust's identification as Culśanś. Culśanś also differs from Janus in most of his representations, in that he wears a special cap. Some scholars have compared it to a petasos, the traveller's hat worn by the Greek god, Hermes. Others see a possible connection to the galerus, a special hat worn by Roman priests which the Romans likely adopted from the Etruscans.

A (possible) representation of Culśanś that is of a very different nature than the Cortona figure, occurs on a stone sarcophagus from Tuscania, dating to 300 BCE. This sarcophagus shows an older, bearded bifrons wielding a sickle blade in a scene of combat. The imagery has been interpreted as relating to quite differing narratives. Maggiani identifies the two-faced figure as the Greek mythological guard called Argos. Nancy Thomson de Grummond, on the other hand, recognizes the figure as Culśanś and interprets the imagery as a Gigantomachy scene in which Culśanś plays a role.

=== Inscriptions ===
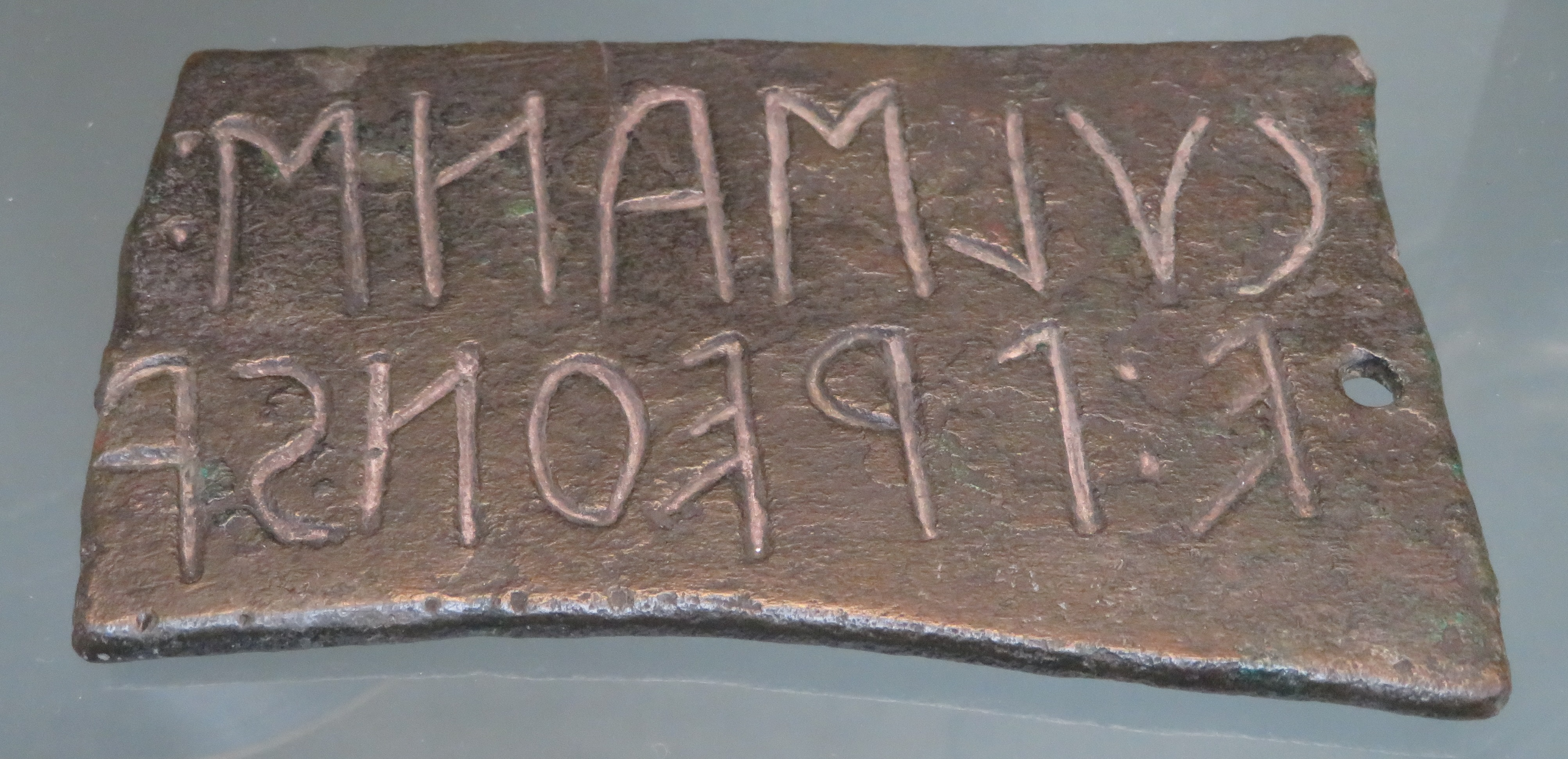
Bronze plaque with dedication to Culsans in Etruscan.

Apart from the inscription on the leg of the Cortona bronze statuette, (Note: Co 3.4. stap 4/3 "v. cvinti. arnt^{2}iaś. culśanśl^{3}alpan. turce".) the other known reference to Culśanś is a fragmentary inscription on a small, partially incomplete slate from Firenzuolo. The inscription was probably a dedication made to the god which was inscribed on a tablet so that it could be attached to a votive offering.

An abbreviated inscription on the Bronze Liver from Piacenza which reads Cvl alp might refer to Culśanś but it could also refer to Culśu. The liver includes references to approximately 28 deities whose various names are organized into 16 compartments marked out on the liver, each of which reflects a different region of the heavens. Van der Meer argues that it is more likely that “Cvl” inscription on the liver is an abbreviation for Culśu because the region on which the inscription occurs, includes several deities associated with the underworld; since of the two, only Culśu has evidence for being an underworld deity it would make more sense for her to be represented. There are a few additional inscriptions that include the root -cul / -cvl, but these are likely names.

== Foreign equivalents ==
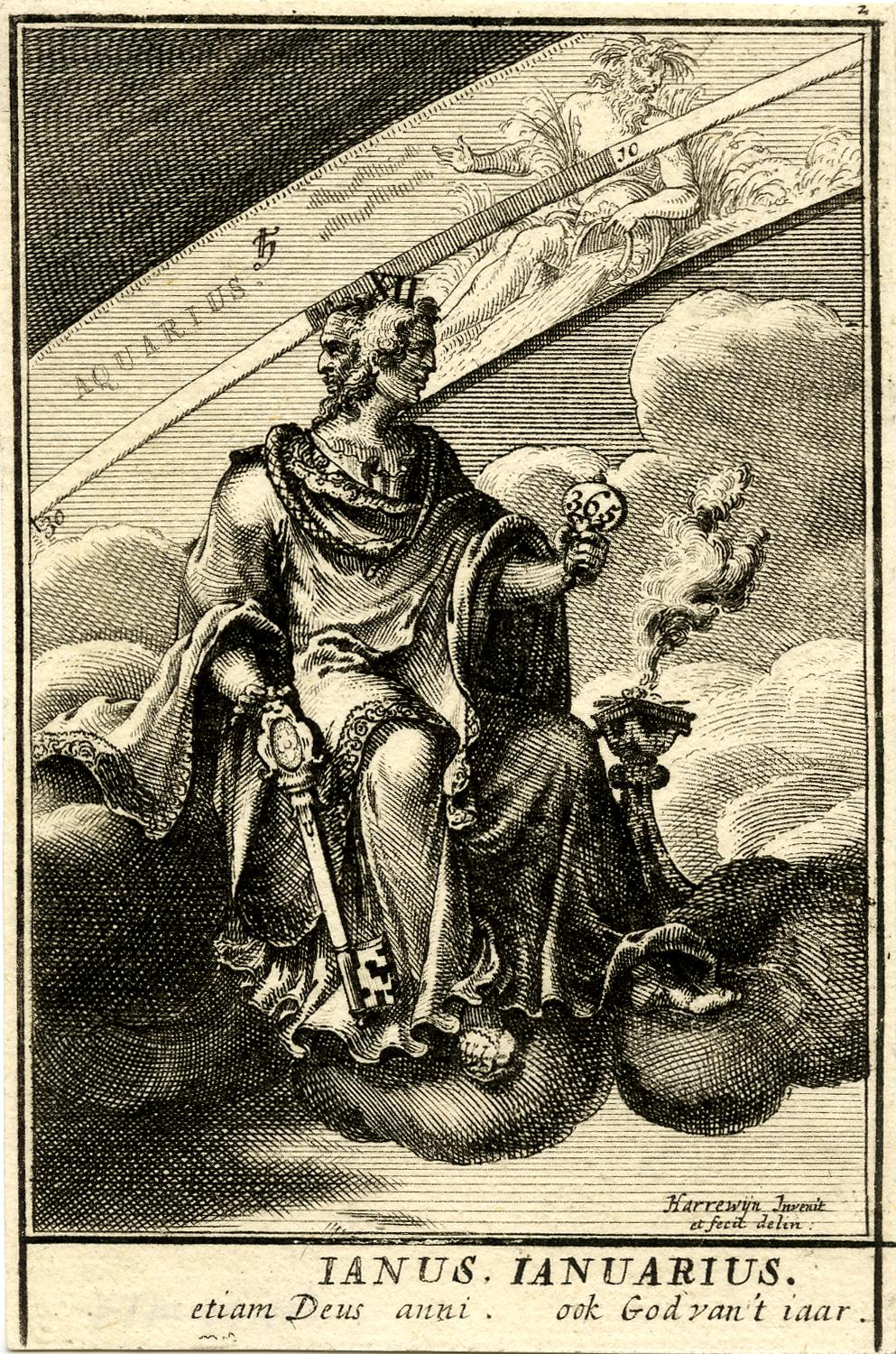
Culsans has been linked with Janus

Culsans is usually equated with the Roman deity Janus. Judith Swaddling identifies Culsans as the 'Etruscan Janus, keeper of the gate'. Many Etruscan scholars are hesitant to fully equate Etruscan deities with other gods. For example, Erika Simon, while recognizing the value of making comparisons to non-Etruscan gods, stresses that Etruscan deities are rarely exact equivalents of a Greek or Roman deity. To avoid confusion she recommends using Etruscan forms of a divinity's name to avoid making unwarranted assumptions. In a similar vein, Adriano Maggiani points out that while myths and iconography frequently migrate from one culture to another, the meaning and connotations associated with those mythological images can be drastically altered to suit the needs of the culture that adopts them. Nevertheless, a number of comparisons have been made between Culśanś and other foreign divinities.

Ambros Josef Pfiffig, drawing on Goetze, sees the name Culśanś as having an etymological root that means “watch, see or keep an eye on”. He considers Culśanś as related to the Umbrian Spector and possibly to other double-faced watchmen gods coming from Babylonia, though he does point out that no two equivalent gods are exactly alike. Simon argues that the iconography for two-faced deities originally came from the East during the Archaic period, perhaps via cauldron protomes. Maggiani sees a parallel between Culśanś and the Greek deity, Argos, whom Hera placed as a watchful guardian over Io after she had been turned into a cow. He is often depicted as a creature with many eyes, but he can also be rendered with two faces. Maggiani sees this two-headed, sleepless watchman as a possible parallel to Culśanś.
