= Januš =

Januš is a Czech- and Slovak-language diminutive of the given name Jan. It can be both a given name or a surname (feminine: Janušová). Notable people with the name include:

- Januš Štrukelj, Slovenian retired footballer
- Miroslav Januš, Czech sport shooter

== See also ==
- Janusz, Polish-language equivalent of the given name
