= Terebra venilia =

Scientific classification
- Kingdom: Animalia
- Phylum: Mollusca
- Class: Gastropoda
- Subclass: Caenogastropoda
- Order: Neogastropoda
- Family: Terebridae
- Genus: Terebra
- Species: T. venilia

Binomial name
- Terebra venilia Tenison-Woods, 1880

Species of gastropod

Terebra venilia is a species of sea snail, a marine gastropod mollusc in the family Terebridae, the auger snails.
