= Picus =

Greek and Roman mythological figure

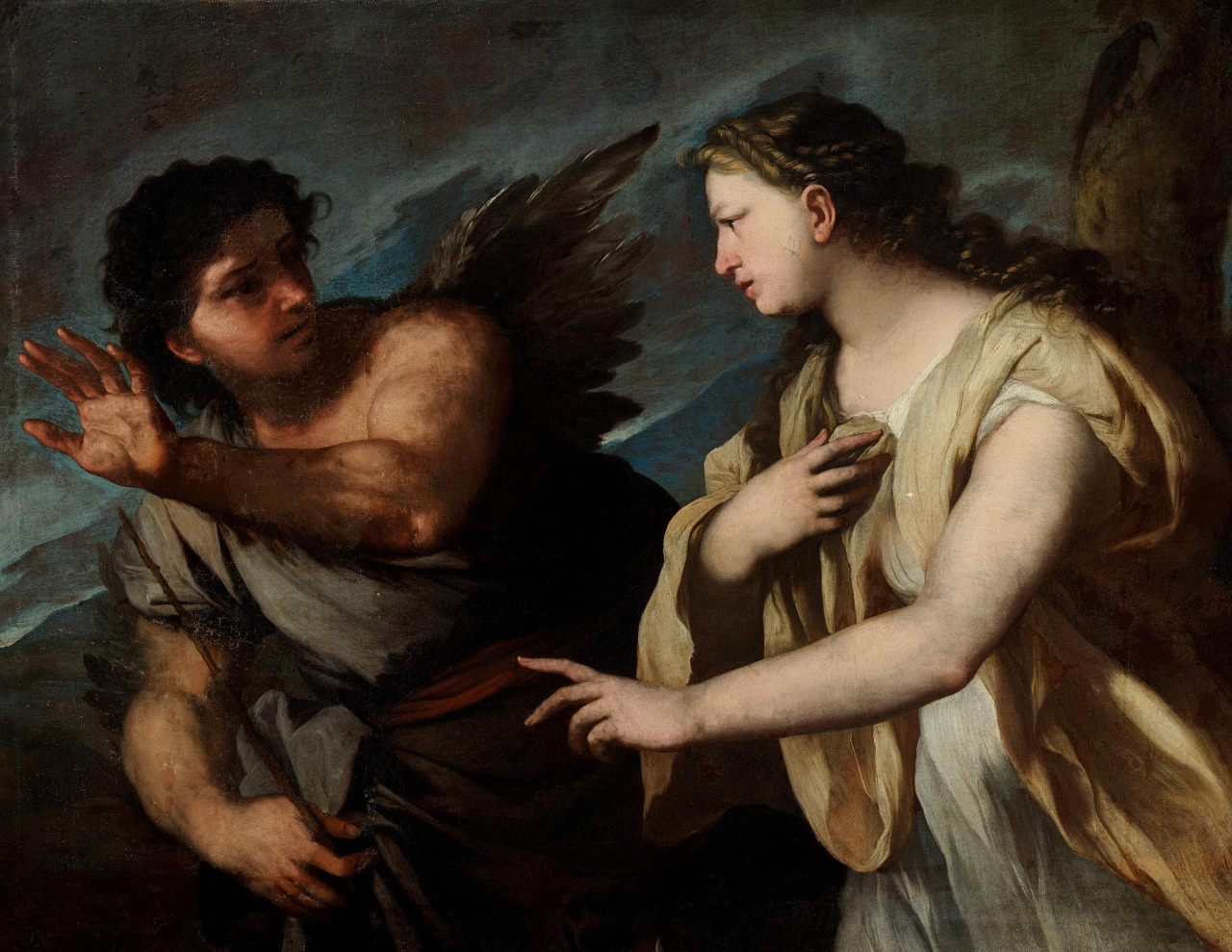
Picus

Picus was a figure in Roman mythology, the first king of Latium. He was the son of Saturn, also known as Stercutus. He was the founder of the first Latin tribe and settlement, Laurentum, located a few miles to the Southeast of the site of the later city of Rome. He was known for his skill at augury and horsemanship.

== Mythology ==
According to Festus he got his name as a consequence of the fact that he used to rely on a woodpecker for the purpose of divination. Picus was also described to be quite handsome, sought after by nymphs and naiads. The witch Circe attempted to seduce him with her charms and herbs while he was on a hunting trip, but he savagely rejected her. She turned him into a woodpecker for scorning her love. When his comrades accused Circe of her crime and demanded Picus' release, she turned them too into a variety of beasts. Picus' wife (to whom he was wholly devoted) was Canens, a nymph. After Picus' transformation she wandered madly through the forest for 6 days until finally she lay down on the bank of the Tiber and died. They had one son, Faunus.

According to grammarian Servius, Picus's love for Pomona was itself scorned. But in another place he states she consented to marriage, but Circe transformed Picus into a woodpecker and her into a pica, a kind of bird, probably a magpie or an owl. He is featured in one of the Metamorphoses of Ovid. Virgil says that he was the son of Saturnus and the grandfather of Latinus, the king of the Laurentines whom Aeneas and his Trojans fought upon reaching Italy.

Italic people believed Picus was the son of the god of war Mars and attributed his avine transformation to his skills at interpreting bird omens.

One of the functions he performed was to lead the dedication of colonies (made up of younger generation folk) with his flight, which traditionally took place in spring and was performed according to a religious ritual known as ver sacrum. The people of the Picentes derived their name from the memory of this ritual.
