= Portunus (mythology) =

Ancient Roman god of keys and ports

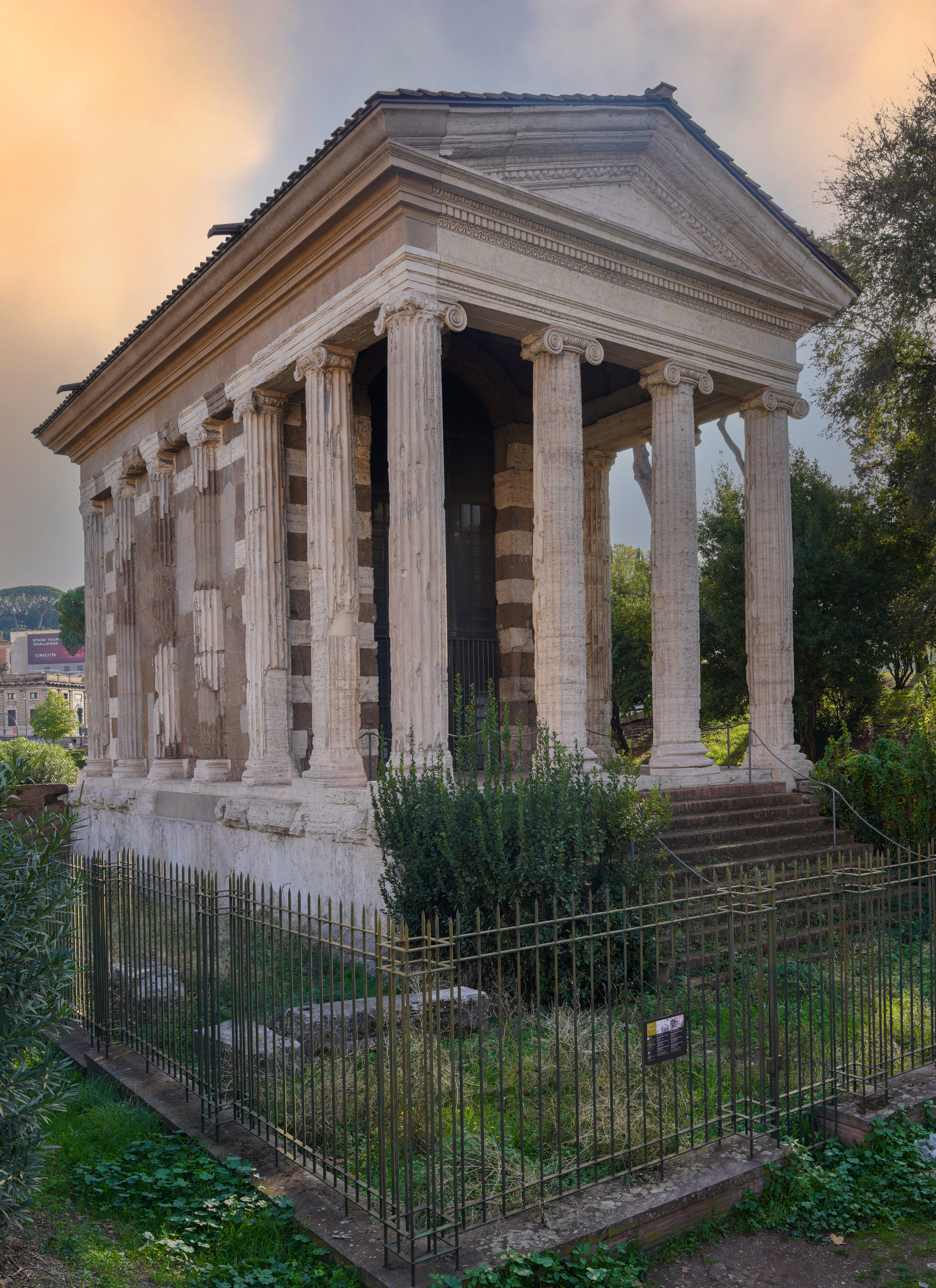
Temple of Portunus in the Forum Boarium

Portunus was the ancient Roman god of keys, doors, livestock and ports. He may have originally protected the warehouses where grain was stored, but later became associated with ports, perhaps because of folk associations between porta "gate, door" and portus "harbor", the "gateway" to the sea, or because of an expansion in the meaning of portus. Portunus later became conflated with the Greek Palaemon. Portunus's festival, celebrated on August 17, the sixteenth day before the Kalends of September, was the Portunalia, a minor occasion in the Roman year. On this day, keys were thrown into a fire for good luck in a very solemn and lugubrious manner. His attribute was a key and his main temple in the city of Rome, the Temple of Portunus, was to be found in the Forum Boarium near the city's oldest riverine port, the Portus Tiberinus, and the oldest stone bridge over the river, the Pons Aemilius.

Portunus appears to be closely related to the god Janus, with whom he shares many characters, functions and the symbol of the key. He too was represented as a two headed being, with each head facing opposite directions, on coins and as figurehead of ships. He was considered to be deus portuum portarumque praeses (lit. God presiding over ports and gates). The relationship between the two gods is underlined by the fact that the date chosen for the dedication of the rebuilt temple of Janus in the Forum Holitorium by emperor Tiberius is the day of the Portunalia, August 17.

Linguist Giuliano Bonfante has speculated, on the grounds of his cult and of the meaning of his name, that Portunus should be a very archaic deity and might date back to an era when Latins lived in dwellings built on pilings. He argues that in Latin the words porta (door, gate) and portus (harbour, port) share their etymology from the same Indo-European root meaning ford, wading point.

Portunus's flamen, the flamen Portunalis, was one of the flamines minores and performed the ritual of oiling the spear (hasta) on the statue of god Quirinus, with an ointment especially prepared for this purpose and stored in a small vase (persillum).

== References and sources ==
=== Sources ===
- Marcus Terentius Varro, De Lingua Latina vi.19.
- Chisholm, Hugh, ed. (1911). "Portunus" . Encyclopædia Britannica (11th ed.). Cambridge University Press.
