= Faunus =

Roman deity of the countryside

- God of the forest, plains, and fields
- Member of the Di indigetes
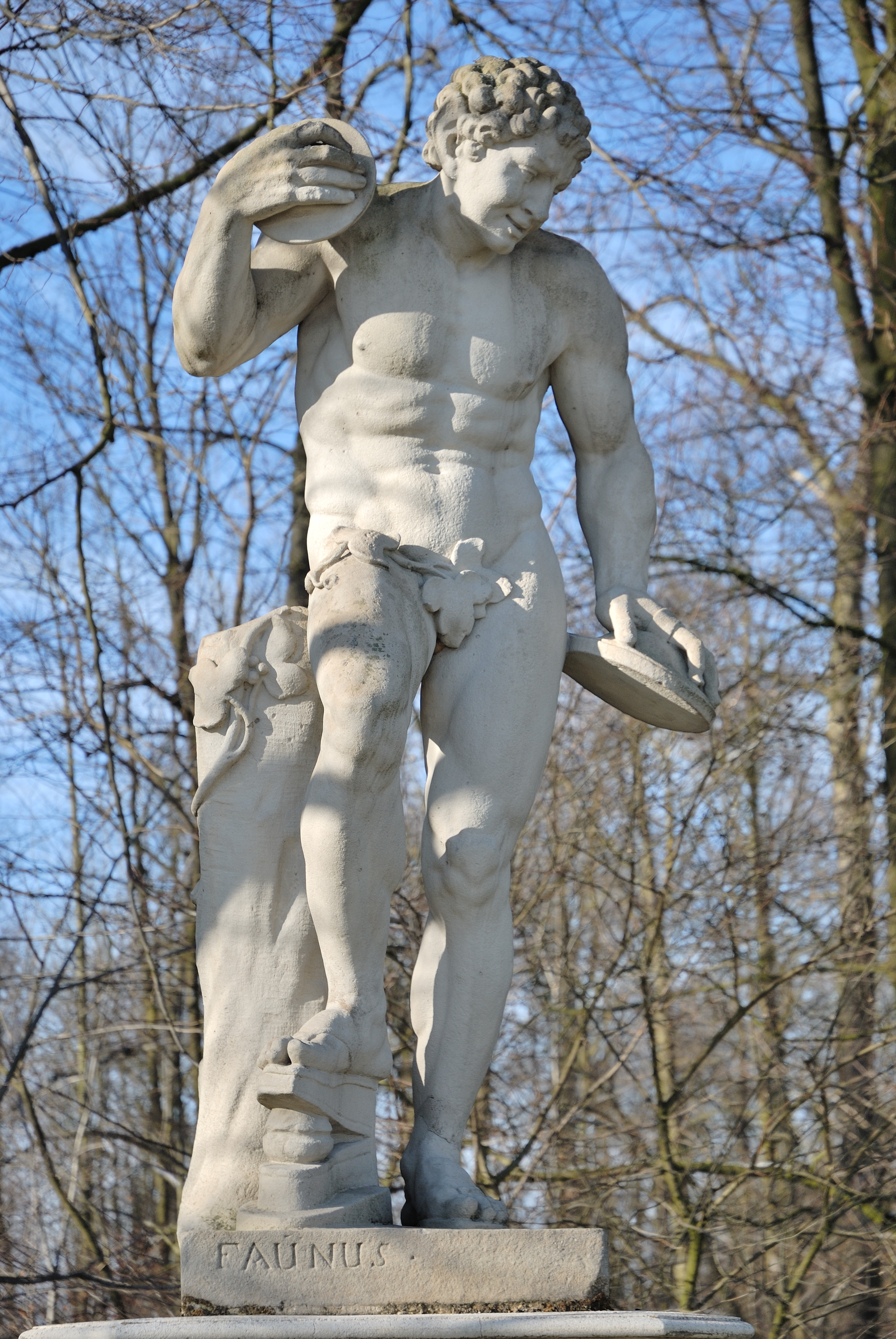
- Statue of Faunus at Schloss Nordkirchen
- Other names: Inuus
- Major cult center: a shrine on the Insula Tiberina
- Gender: male
- Festivals: Faunalia (13 February and 5 December)
- Parents: Picus and Canens
- Consort: Flora, Marica, Fauna
- Offspring: Latinus

Equivalents
- Greek: Pan

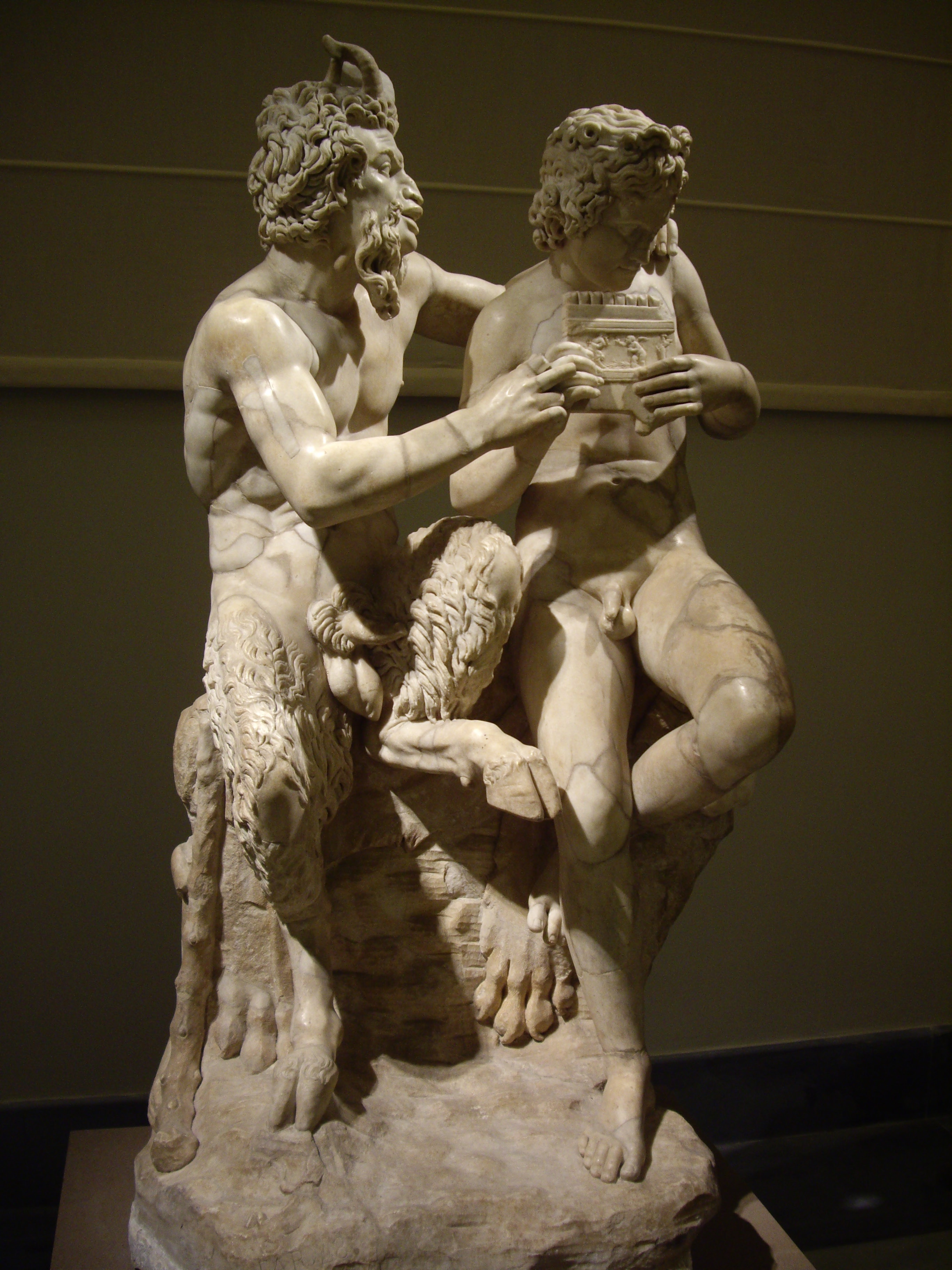
Faunus and Daphnis practising the Pan flute (Roman copy of Greek original).

In ancient Roman religion and myth, Faunus [ˈfau̯nʊs] was the rustic god of the forest, plains and fields; when he made cattle fertile, he was called Inuus. He came to be equated in literature with the Greek god Pan, after which Romans depicted him as a horned god.

Faunus was one of the oldest Roman deities, known as the di indigetes. According to the epic poet Virgil, he was a legendary king of the Latins. His shade was consulted as a goddess of prophecy under the name of Fatuus, with oracles in the sacred grove of Tibur, around the well Albunea, and on the Aventine Hill in ancient Rome itself.

Marcus Terentius Varro asserted that the oracular responses were given in Saturnian verse. Faunus revealed the future in dreams and voices that were communicated to those who came to sleep in his precincts, lying on the fleeces of sacrificed lambs. Fowler (1899) suggested that Faunus is identical with Favonius, one of the Roman wind gods (compare the Anemoi).

== Etymology ==
The name Faunus is generally thought to stem from Proto-Italic *fawe or *fawono (variant *fawōn(jo)), thus being cognate with Umbrian fons, foner ('merciful'). It may ultimately derive from Proto-Indo-European (PIE) *bʰh₂u-n ('favourable'), which also reflects Old Irish búan ('good, favourable, firm') and Middle Welsh bun ('maiden, sweetheart').

Another theory contends that Faunus is the Latin outcome of PIE *dhau-no- ('the strangler', thus denoting the 'wolf'), a proposition suggested by the fact that the two Luperci ("wolf-men", from Latin lupus, 'wolf') are commonly treated as temporary priests of the god Faunus. If so, his name would be cognate with the Greek θαῦνον (a less common synonym of θηρίον, 'wild animal').

== Origin ==
Faunus may be of Indo-European origin and related to the Vedic god Rudra. It is believed that he was worshipped by traditional Roman farmers before becoming a nature deity.

== Consorts and family ==
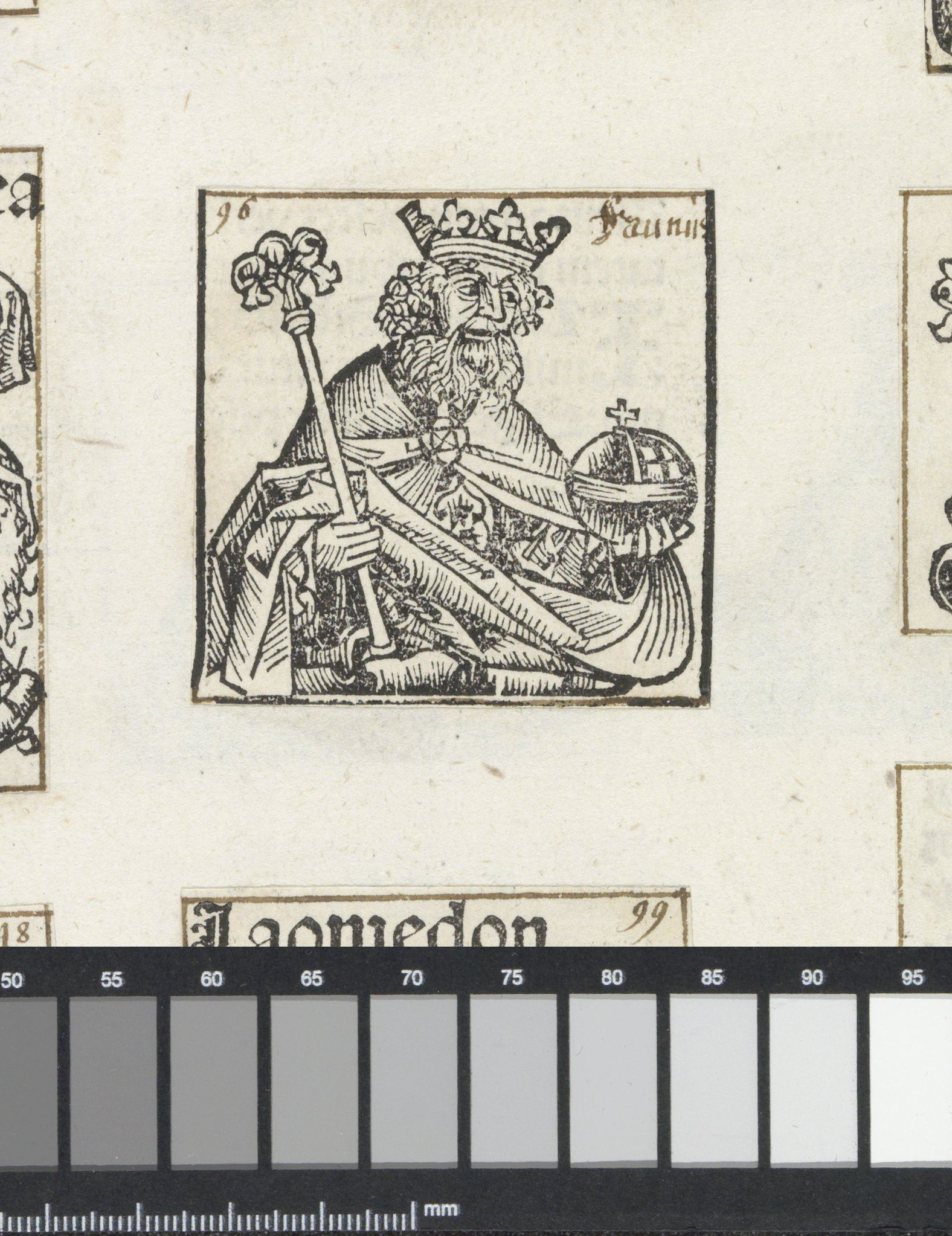
Faunus depicted as King of Latium (Nuremberg Chronicle, 1493)

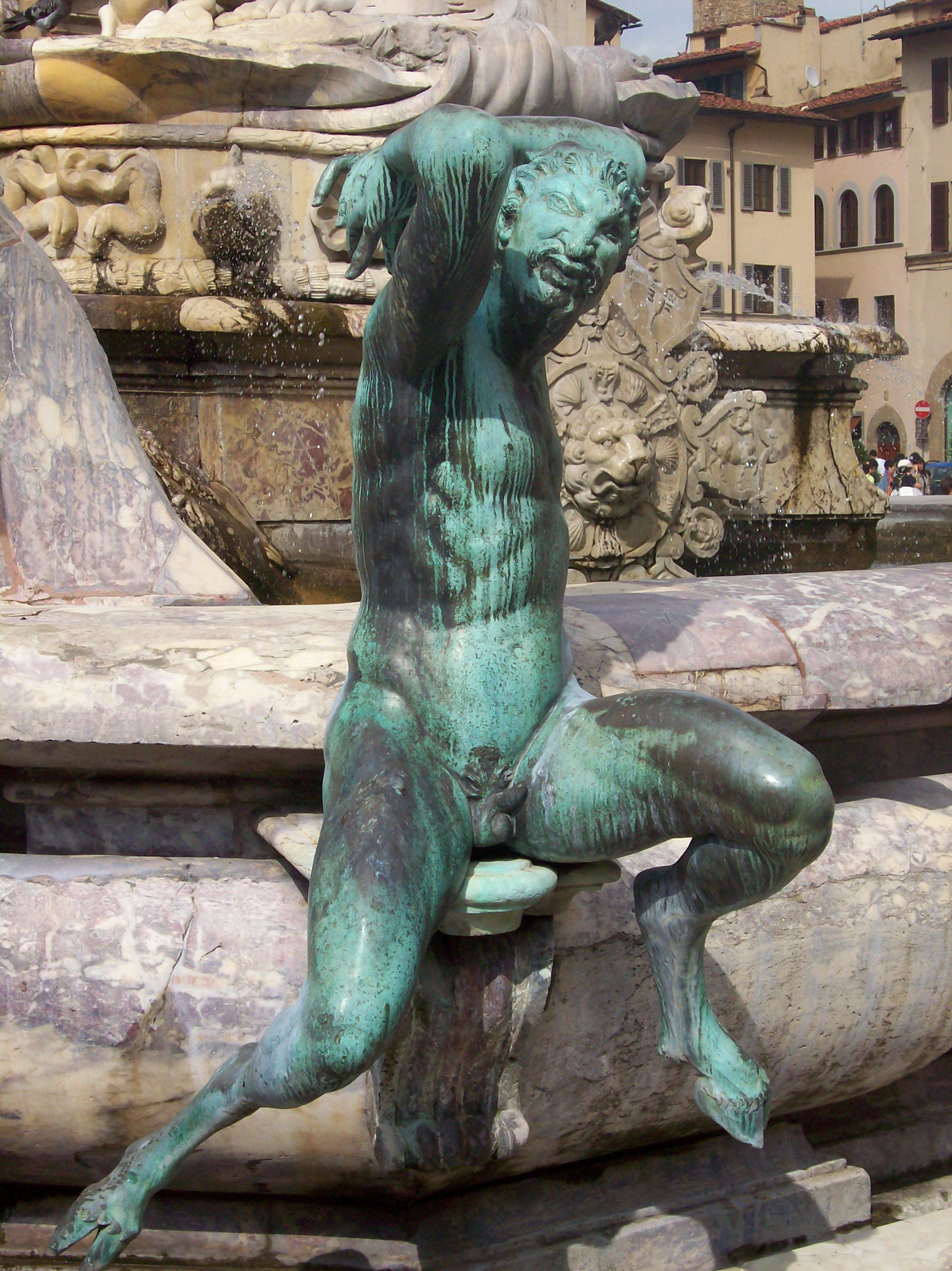
Image of Faunus taken at the Fountain of Neptune in Florence, Italy. Sculpture by Bartolomeo Ammanati.

In fable Faunus appears as an old king of Latium, grandson of Saturnus, son of Picus, and father of Latinus by the nymph Marica (who was also sometimes Faunus' mother). After his death he is raised to the position of a tutelary deity of the land, for his many services to agriculture and cattle-breeding.

A goddess of like attributes, called Fauna and Fatua, was associated in his worship. She was regarded as his sister and wife. The female deity Bona Dea was often equated with Fauna.

As Pan was accompanied by the Paniskoi, or little Pans, so the existence of many Fauni was assumed besides the chief Faunus. Fauns are place-spirits (genii) of untamed woodland. Educated, Hellenizing Romans connected their fauns with the Greek satyrs, who were wild and orgiastic drunken followers of Dionysus, with a distinct origin.

== Conflation with Greek Pan ==
Faunus was naturally conflated with the Greek god Pan, who was a pastoral god of shepherds who was said to reside in Arcadia. With the increasing influence of Greek mythology on Roman mythology in the 3rd and 2nd centuries BCE, the Romans identified their own deities with Greek ones in what was called interpretatio Romana. However, the two deities were also considered separate by many; for instance, the epic poet Virgil, in his Aeneid, independently mentioned both Faunus and Pan.

Pan had always been depicted with horns whereas the original Roman Faunus was not. An indication of the cultural conflation of the two can be seen in many Roman depictions of Faunus that also began to display Faunus with horns.

== Festivals ==
In Justin's epitome, Faunus is identified with Lupercus ("he who wards off the wolf"), otherwise a priest of Faunus. Livy named Inuus as the god originally worshiped at the Lupercalia, 15 February, when his priests (Luperci) wore goat-skins and hit passers-by with goatskin whips.

Two festivals, called Faunalia, were celebrated in his honour—one on 13 February, in the temple of Faunus on the island in the Tiber, the other on 5 December, when the peasants brought him rustic offerings and amused themselves with dancing.

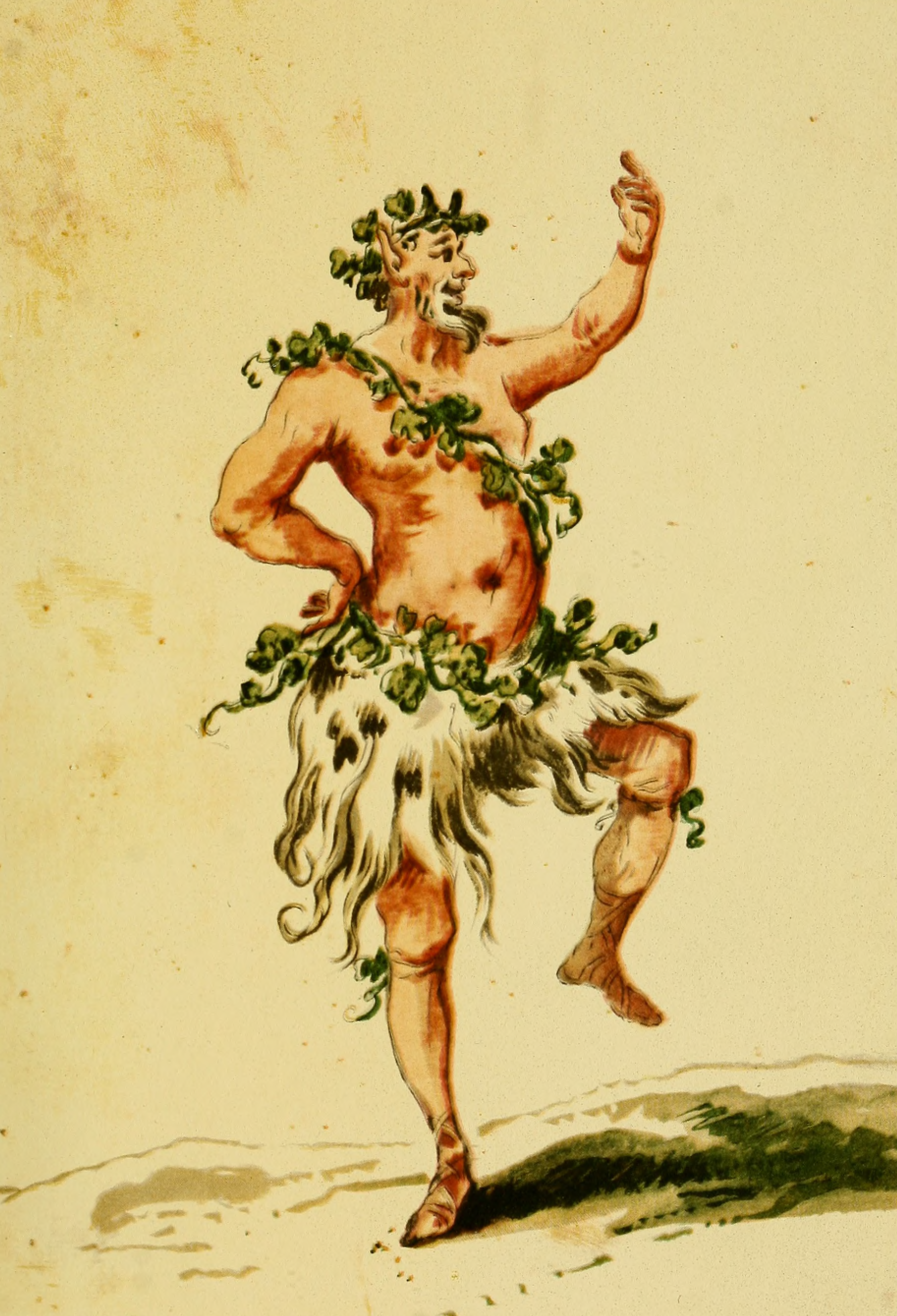
Sketch of a Faunus costume for the Joseph Haydn opera Armida

A euhemeristic account made Faunus a Latin king, son of Picus and Canens. He was then revered as the god Fatuus after his death, worshipped in a sacred forest outside what is now Tivoli, but had been known since Etruscan times as Tibur, the seat of the Tiburtine Sibyl. His numinous presence was recognized by wolf skins, with wreaths and goblets.

In Nonnos' Dionysiaca, Faunus/Phaunos accompanied Dionysus when the god campaigned in India.

== Later worship ==
Faunus was worshipped across the Roman Empire for many centuries. An example of this was a set of thirty-two 4th century spoons found near Thetford in England in 1979. They had been engraved with the name "Faunus", and each had a different epithet after the god's name. The spoons also bore Christian symbols, and it has been suggested that these were initially Christian but later taken and devoted to Faunus by pagans. The 4th century was a time of large scale Christianisation, and the discovery provides evidence that even during the decline of traditional Roman religion, the god Faunus was still worshipped.

In Gaul, Faunus was identified with the Celtic Dusios.

== See also ==
- Wild man or Woodwose—Wild, humanoid creature in folklore
- Green Man—English nature deity
- Basajaun—Basque forest guardian and nature god

== Bibliography ==
- Briquel, Dominique (1974). "Le problème des Dauniens". Mélanges de l'École française de Rome. 86 (1): 7–40. doi:10.3406/mefr.1974.962.
- de Vaan, Michiel (2008). Etymological Dictionary of Latin and the other Italic Languages. Brill. ISBN 9789004167971.
- Hammond, N.G.L.; Scullard, H.H., eds. (1970). The Oxford Classical Dictionary. Oxford, UK: Oxford University Press. ISBN 0-19-869117-3.
- Nečas Hraste, D.; Vuković, K. (2011). "Rudra-Shiva and Silvanus-Faunus: Savage and Propitious". The Journal of Indo-European Studies. 39 (1&2): 100–115. ISSN 0092-2323.
- Sergent, Bernard (1991). "Ethnozoonymes indo-européens". Dialogues d'histoire ancienne. 17 (2): 9–55. doi:10.3406/dha.1991.1932.
