= History of the Latin script =

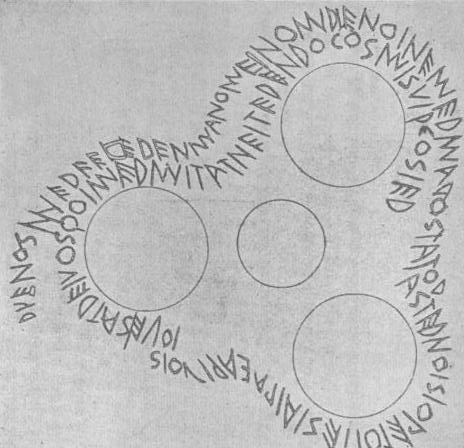
The Duenos inscription, dated to the 6th century BC, shows the earliest known forms of the old Latin alphabet.

The Latin script is the most widely used alphabetic writing system in the world. It is the standard script of the English language and is often referred to simply as "the alphabet" in English. It is a true alphabet which originated in the 7th century BC in Italy and has changed continually over the last 2,500 years. It has roots in the Semitic alphabet and its offshoot alphabets, the Phoenician, Greek, and Etruscan. The phonetic values of some letters changed, some letters were lost and gained, and several writing styles ("hands") developed. Two such styles, the minuscule and majuscule hands, were combined into one script with alternate forms for the lower and upper case letters. Modern uppercase letters differ only slightly from their classical counterparts, and there are few regional variants.

== Summary of evolution ==
The Latin alphabet started out as uppercase serifed letters known as Roman square capitals. The lowercase letters evolved through cursive styles that developed to adapt the inscribed alphabet to being written with a pen. Over the ages many dissimilar stylistic forms of each letter evolved but, when not becoming a recognised subform to transliterate exotic tongues, denoted the same letter. After the evolution from the Western Greek Alphabet through Old Italic alphabet, G developed from C, the consonantal I (namely J) from a flourished I, V and U split likewise and the Germanic-centred ligature of VV became W, the letter thorn Þ was introduced from the runic alphabet but was lost in all except Icelandic, and s would be normally written as a long s (ſ), and when coming before z, it formed the ligature ß, which has survived in German to this day as a separate letter. S would settle as it appears today a terminal s (as it always had been at a word's end) after the 7th century AD – the internal forms were widely deprecated by the 19th century.

However, thanks to classical revival, Roman capitals were reintroduced by humanists making old Latin inscriptions easily legible while many medieval manuscripts are unreadable to an untrained modern reader, due to unfamiliar letterforms, narrow spacing and abbreviation marks save for the apostrophe and Carolingian minuscule letters (lower caps).

The phonetic value of some letters has changed in live languages whether or not from Latin origins, each seeing diverse softenings, drifts or phonetic complications such as in Italian, English, Dutch and French. Vowels have also evolved with notably great vowel shifts in English and Portuguese. Orthography does not fully match phonetics – an illustration being that ⟨o⟩ became used rather than ⟨u⟩ when before i, m, n, v, w for legibility, namely to avoid a succession of vertical strokes, in English. Within each language there are homophonic heterographs (words written differently but sounding the same) and the adoption of digraphs for new sounds, such as ⟨sh⟩ for the voiceless postalveolar fricative in English, being ⟨ch⟩ in French, yet ⟨ch⟩ in Italian denotes k or the very basic words that began qu and their derivations. A theme for digraphs is widespread use of h as a second letter, avoiding diacritics onto, under, or over the first letter (unavailable in most basic printing presses) as in Romance languages h is usually a voiceless remnant.

== Origin ==
It is generally held that the Latins derived their alphabet from the Etruscan alphabet. The Etruscans, in turn, derived their alphabet from the Greek colony of Cumae in Italy, who used a Western variant of the Greek alphabet, which was in turn derived from the Phoenician alphabet, itself derived from Egyptian hieroglyphs. The Latins ultimately adopted 21 of the original 26 Etruscan letters.

=== Legendary origin account in Hyginus ===
Gaius Julius Hyginus, who recorded much Roman mythology, mentions in Fab. 277 the legend that it was Carmenta, the Cimmerian Sibyl, who altered fifteen letters of the Greek alphabet to become the Latin alphabet, which her son Evander introduced into Latium, supposedly 60 years before the Trojan War, but there is no historically sound basis to this tale.

The Parcae, Clotho, Lachesis, and Atropos invented seven Greek letters – A B H T I Y. Others say that Mercury invented them from the flight of cranes, which, when they fly, form letters. Palamedes, too, son of Nauplius, invented eleven letters; Simonides, too, invented four letters – O E Z PH; Epicharmus of Sicily, two – P and PS. The Greek letters Mercury is said to have brought to Egypt, and from Egypt Cadmus took them to Greece. Cadmus in exile from Arcadia, took them to Italy, and his mother Carmenta changed them to Latin to the number of 15. Apollo on the lyre added the rest.

=== Ultimate derivation from Egyptian hieroglyphs ===
Below is a table synoptically showing selected Proto-Sinaitic signs and the proposed correspondences with Phoenician letters. Also shown are the sound values, names, and descendants of the Phoenician letters.

Possible correspondences between Hieroglyphs, Phoenician and Latin alphabets
| Hieroglyph | Proto-Sinaitic | IPA value | Reconstructed name | Proto-Canaanite | Phoenician | Archaic Greek | Modern Greek (for reference) | Etruscan | Latin |
|---|---|---|---|---|---|---|---|---|---|
| F1 | Aleph | /ʔ/ | ʾalp "ox" | Aleph | Aleph | | Α | 𐌀 | A |
| O1 | Bet | /b/ | bayt "house" | Bet | Beth | | Β | 𐌁 | B |
| T14 | Gimel | /g/ | gaml "throwstick" | Gimel | Gimel | | Γ | 𐌂 | C G |
| K1K2 | Dalet | /d/ | dag "fish" | Dalet | Dalet | | Δ | 𐌃 | D |
| A28 | Heh | /h/ | haw/hillul "praise" | He | He | | Ε | 𐌄 | E |
| G43 | Waw | /w/ | waw/uph "fowl" | Waw | Waw | | Ϝ | 𐌅 | F |
| G43 | Waw | /w/ | waw/uph "fowl" | Waw | Waw | | Υ | 𐌖 | U V W Y |
| Z4 | Zayin | /z/ | zayn/zayt "sword" | Zayin | Zayin | | Z | 𐌆 | Z |
| Z4 | Zayin | /ð/ | ḏiqq "manacle" | | Zayin | | Z | 𐌆 | Z |
| O6 N24 V28 | Ḥet | /ħ/ | ḥaṣr "courtyard" | Heth | Ḥet | | Η | 𐌇 | H |
| V28 | Ḥet | /x/ | ḫayt "thread" | Heth | Ḥet | | Η | 𐌇 | H |
| D36 | Yad | /j/ | yad "hand" | Yodh | Yad | | Ι | I | I J |
| D46 | Khof | /k/ | kap "palm" | Kaph | Kaph | | Κ | 𐌊 | K |
| U20 | Lamed | /l/ | lamd "goad" | Lamedh | Lamed | | Λ | 𐌋 ϟ | L |
| N35 | Mem | /m/ | maym "water" | Mem | Mem | | Μ | 𐌌 | M |
| I10 | Nun | /n/ | naḥaš "snake" | Nun | Nun | | Ν | 𐌍 | N |
| D4 | Ayin | /ʕ/ | ʿayn "eye" | Ayin | Ayin | | Ο | 𐌏 | O |
| V28 | 𓎛 | /ɣ/ | ġabiʿ "calyx" | Ghayn | Ayin | | Ο | 𐌏 | O |
| D21 | Pe (Semitic letter) | /p/ | pʿit "corner" | Pe | Pe (Semitic letter) | | Π | 𐌐 | P |
| O34 | Qoph | /kˤ/ or /q/ | qoba "needle/nape/monkey" | Qoph | Qoph | | Φ | 𐌘 | Q |
| D1D19 | Resh | /r/ | raʾš "head" | Resh | Res | | Ρ | 𐌓 | R |
| N6 | Shin | /ʃ/ | šimš "sun" | Shin | Shin | | Σ | 𐌔 | S |
| M39M40M41 | Shin | /ɬ/ | śadeh "field, land" | Shin | Shin | | Σ | 𐌔 | S |
| M39M40M41 | Shin | /θ/ | ṯann "bow" | | Shin | | Τ | 𐌕 | T |
| Z9 | Tof | /t/ | tāw "mark" | Taw | Taw | | Τ | 𐌕 | T |
| N/A | | | | | | | Χ | 𐌗 | X |

== Archaic Latin alphabet ==
The original Latin alphabet was:

Original Latin alphabet, in the modern equivalent letters
| A | B | C | D | E | F | Z | H | I | K | L | M | N | O | P | Q | R | S | T | V | X |

The oldest Latin inscriptions do not distinguish between /ɡ/ and /k/, represented both by C, K and Q according to position. This is explained by the fact that the Etruscan language did not make this distinction. K was used before A; Q was used (if at all) before O or V; C was used elsewhere. C derived from Greek Gamma (Γ) and Q from Greek Koppa (Ϙ). In later Latin, K survived only in a few forms such as Kalendae; Q survived only before V (representing /kw/), and C was used everywhere else. G was later invented to distinguish between /ɡ/ and /k/; it was originally simply a C with an additional stroke.

=== Phonetics ===
- C stood for both /k/ and /ɡ/.
- I stood for both /i/ and /j/.
- V stood for both /u/ and /w/.

== Old Latin period ==
K was marginalized in favour of C, which afterward stood for both /ɡ/ and /k/.

Probably during the 3rd century BC, the Z was dropped and a new letter G was placed in its position – according to Plutarch, by Spurius Carvilius Ruga – so that afterward, C = /k/, G = /ɡ/.

Old Latin could be written from right to left (as were Etruscan and early Greek) or boustrophedon, while writing from the middle Republic on was almost always left-to-right.

Old Latin alphabet, in the modern equivalent letters
| A | B | C | D | E | F | G | H | I | K | L | M | N | O | P | Q | R | S | T | V | X |

== Classical Latin period ==
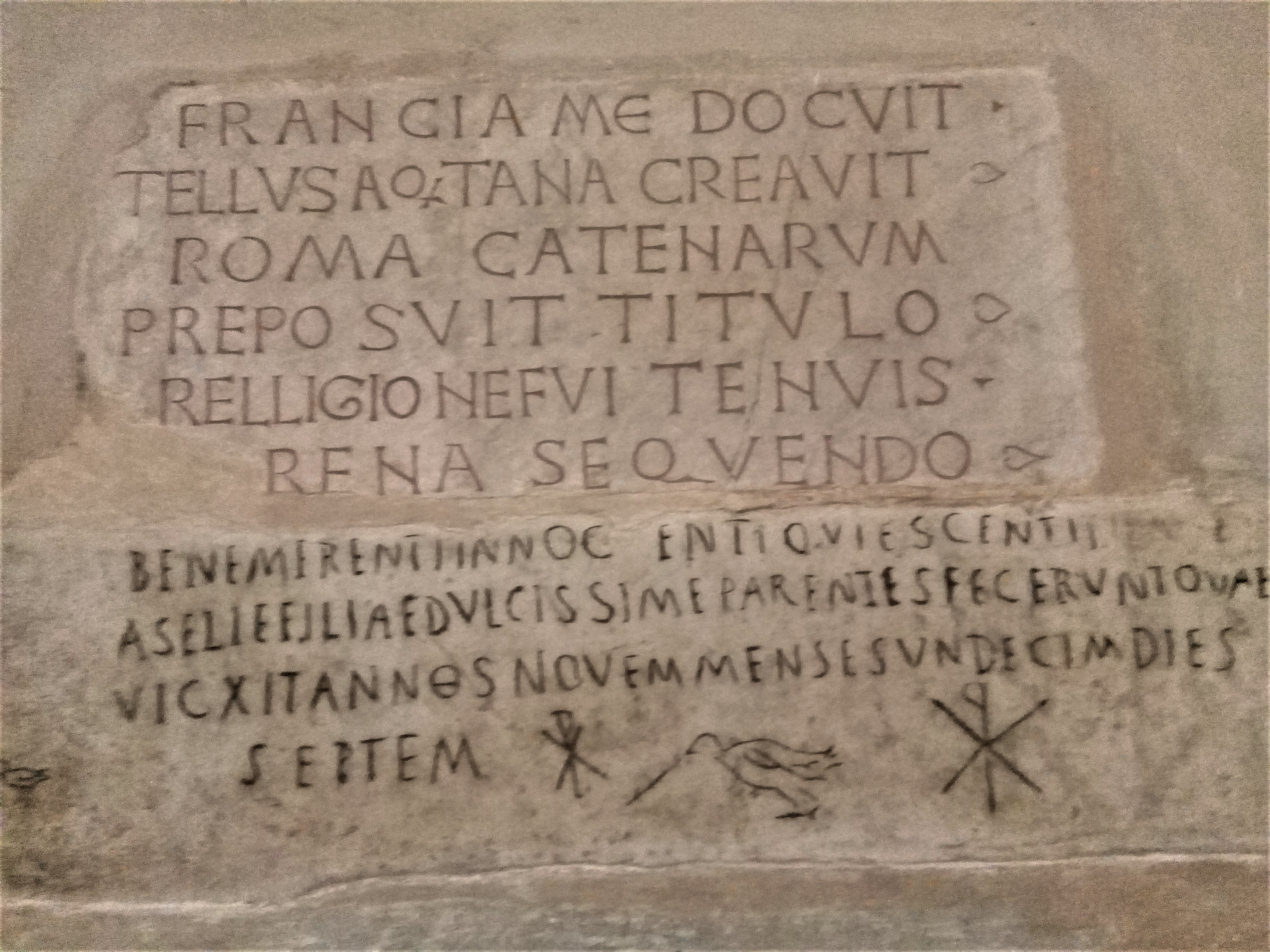
Two carvings in San Pietro in Vincoli, Rome. The lower dates to the 4th century AD, with letters in a Roman cursive style and no spaces between words.

After the conquest of Greece in the 1st century BC, the letters Y and Z were, respectively, adopted and readopted from the Greek alphabet and placed at the end; a later attempt by the emperor Claudius to introduce three additional letters was short-lived. Now the new Latin alphabet contained 23 letters:

Classical Latin alphabet
| Letter | A | B | C | D | E | F | G | H | I | K | L | M | N | O | P | Q | R | S | T | V | X | Y | Z |
|---|---|---|---|---|---|---|---|---|---|---|---|---|---|---|---|---|---|---|---|---|---|---|---|
| Latin name (majus) | á | bé | cé | dé | é | ef | gé | há | í | ká | el | em | en | ó | pé | qv́ | er | es | té | v́ | ix | í graeca | zéta |
| Latin name | ā | bē | cē | dē | ē | ef | gē | hā | ī | kā | el | em | en | ō | pē | qū | er | es | tē | ū | ix | ī Graeca | zēta |
| Latin pronunciation (IPA) | aː | beː | keː | deː | eː | ɛf | ɡeː | haː | iː | kaː | ɛl | ɛm | ɛn | oː | peː | kuː | ɛr | ɛs | teː | uː | iks | iː ˈɡraɪka | ˈdzeːta |

The Latin names of some of the letters are disputed. In general, however, the Romans did not use the traditional (Semitic-derived) names as in Greek, but adopted the simplified names of the Etruscans, which derived from saying the sounds of the letters: the vowels stood for themselves, the names of the stop consonant letters were formed by adding the neutral vowel e, which in Latin became /eː/ (except for K and Q, which were distinguished from C by appending the vowel which followed them in Etruscan orthography), and the names of the continuant consonants were formed by preceded the sound with /e/. X was named /eks/ rather than /kseː/, as /ks/ could not begin a word in Latin (and possibly Etruscan). When the letter Y was introduced into Latin, it was probably called hy /hyː/ as in Greek (the name upsilon being not yet in use), but was changed to i Graeca ("Greek i") as Latin speakers had difficulty distinguishing the sounds /i/ and /y/. Z was given its Greek name, zeta, when it was borrowed. For the Latin sounds represented by the various letters see Latin spelling and pronunciation; for the names of the letters in English see English alphabet and for the sounds in English see English phonetics.

Roman cursive script, also called majuscule cursive and capitalis cursive, was the everyday form of handwriting used for writing letters, by merchants writing business accounts, by schoolchildren learning the Latin alphabet, and even by emperors issuing commands. A more formal style of writing was based on Roman square capitals, but cursive was used for quicker, informal writing. It was most commonly used from about the 1st century BC to the 3rd century AD, but it probably existed earlier than that.

=== Late antiquity ===
The Latin alphabet spread from Italy, along with the Latin language, to the lands surrounding the Mediterranean Sea with the expansion of the Roman Empire. The eastern half of the Roman Empire, including Greece, Asia Minor, the Levant, and Egypt, continued to use Greek as a lingua franca, but Latin was widely spoken in the western half of the Empire, and as the western Romance languages, including French, Italian, Portuguese, Spanish and Catalan, evolved out of Latin they continued to use and adapt the Latin alphabet. In the East, it evolved forming the Romanian language.

Some of the letters had variant shapes in epigraphy:

- ⟨Ꟶ⟩ was used occasionally instead of ⟨H⟩ in Roman Gaul.
- ⟨ꟾ⟩ was sometimes used to mark a long ⟨I⟩.
- ⟨ꟷ⟩ was used in Sub-Roman Britain for the ⟨I⟩ in some grammatical roles.

== Middle Ages ==
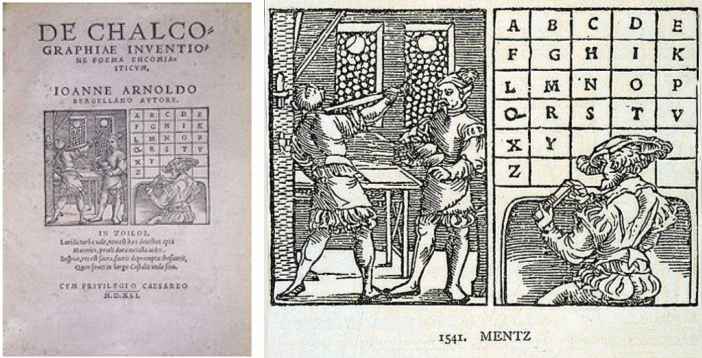
De chalcographiae inventione (1541, Mainz) with the 23 letters. W, U and J are missing.

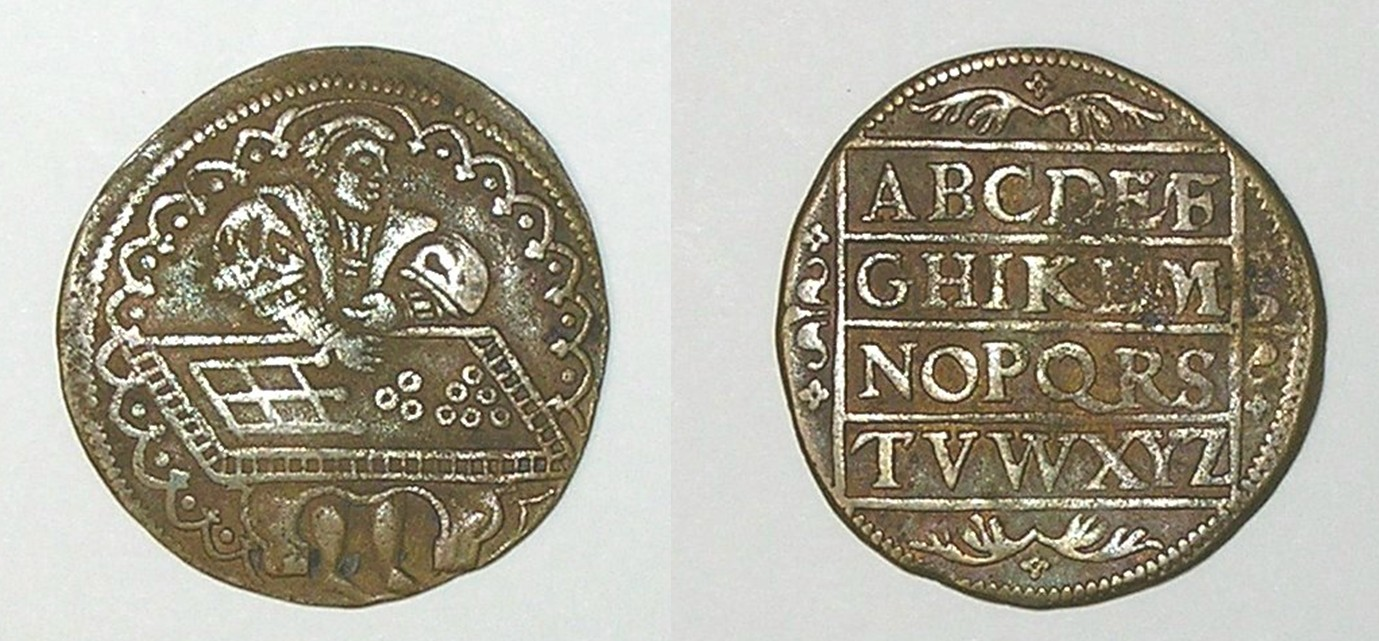
Jeton from Nuremberg, c. 1553, with 24 letters, W is included.

The lower case (minuscule) letters developed in the Middle Ages from New Roman Cursive writing, first as the uncial script, and later as minuscule script. The old Roman letters were retained for formal inscriptions and for emphasis in written documents. The languages that use the Latin alphabet generally use capital letters to begin paragraphs and sentences and for proper nouns. The rules for capitalization have changed over time, and different languages have varied in their rules for capitalization. Old English, for example, was rarely written with even proper nouns capitalised; whereas Modern English of the 18th century had frequently all nouns capitalised, in the same way that Modern German is today.

The use of the letters I and V for both consonants and vowels proved inconvenient as the Latin alphabet was adapted to Germanic and Romance languages. W originated as a doubled V (VV) used to represent the sound [w] found in Old English as early as the 7th century. It came into common use in the later 11th century, replacing the runic Wynn letter which had been used for the same sound. In the Romance languages, the minuscule form of V was a rounded u; from this was derived a rounded capital U for the vowel in the 16th century, while a new, pointed minuscule v was derived from V for the consonant. In the case of I, a word-final swash form, j, came to be used for the consonant, with the un-swashed form restricted to vowel use. Such conventions were erratic for centuries. J was introduced into English for the consonant in the 17th century (being rare as a vowel), but it was not universally considered a distinct letter in the alphabetic order until the 19th century.

The names of the letters were largely unchanged, with the exception of H. As the sound /h/ disappeared from the Romance languages, the original Latin name hā became difficult to distinguish from A. Emphatic forms such as [aha] and [axxa] were used, developing eventually into acca, the direct ancestor of English aitch.

Simplified relationship between various scripts leading to the development of modern lower case of the standard Latin alphabet and that of the modern variants, Fraktur (used in Germany until recently) and Gaelic (Ireland). Several scripts coexisted such as half-uncial and uncial, which derive from Roman cursive and Greek uncial, and Visigothic, Merovingian (Luxeuil variant here) and Beneventan. The Carolingian script was the basis for blackletter and humanist. What is commonly called "Gothic writing" is technically called blackletter (here Textualis quadrata), and is completely unrelated to Visigothic script. The letter j is i with a flourish; u and v are the same letter in early scripts and varied according to position in insular half-uncial and caroline minuscule and later scripts; W is a ligature of vv; in Anglo-Saxon insular the rune wynn is used as a w and thorn (þ) for th. A dot was adopted for i only after late-caroline (protogothic), and in Beneventan script the macron abbreviation featured a dot above. Lost variants such as r rotunda, ligatures and scribal abbreviation marks are omitted, long s is shown when no terminal s (surviving variant) is present. Humanist script was the basis for venetian types which changed little until today, such as Times New Roman (a serif typeface).

== Typography ==
With the spread of printing, several styles of Latin typography emerged with typefaces based on various minuscules of the Middle Ages depending on the region. In Germany, starting with Johannes Gutenberg the commonly used typefaces were based on blackletter scripts, a tradition that lasted until the 20th century, an example of the later typefaces used is fraktur.

In Italy, due to the revival of classical culture, the heavy gothic styles were soon displaced by Venetian Latin types, also called antiqua, which were based on the inscriptional capitals on Roman buildings and monuments. However, humanist scholars of the early 15th century mistook Carolingian minuscule as the authentic writing style of the Romans and redesigned the small Carolingian letter, lengthening ascenders and descenders, and adding incised serifs and finishing strokes to integrate them with the Roman capitals. By the time moveable type reached Italy several decades later, the humanistic writing had evolved into a consistent model known as humanistic minuscule, which served as the basis for Venetian typeface.

== Handwriting ==
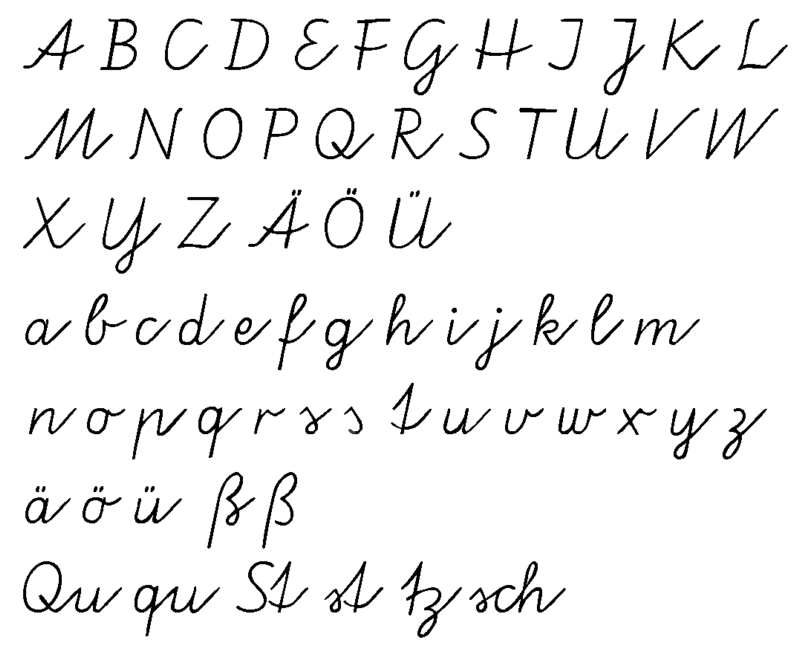
Handwritten form of the Latin script used in Germany

=== Roman cursive ===
In addition to the aforementioned square capitals used in architecture, in the Roman empire and in the Middle Ages for rapidly written vernacular documents roman cursive or even a form of shorthand, called tironian notes, were used.

=== Secretary hand ===
Whereas the meticulously drawn textualis quadrata was the most common script for religious works, starting from the 13th century a common style of handwriting for vernacular work, which were written at speed, was secretary hand, a cursive script, which features amongst several ligatures and contraction distinctive strong "elephant's ear" ascenders and descenders

=== Italic script ===
In the 16th–17th centuries secretary hand was slowly replaced by italic scripts, a semi-cursive group of scripts. Early italic hand, dating from the 15th century, was based on humanist minuscule with pronounced serifs, a single story a, open tailed g, slight forward slope and in the late renaissance could have been written with flourishes and swashes. Italic hand developed into Cancelleresca (chancery) corsiva (also an italic script) used for Vatican documents from the middle of the 16th century, which featured a more prominent slope and lavish swashes (often curled) on capitals.

Additionally this script led to the italic type in typography, which could be used within a text written in Roman type (e.g. "The taxonomic name of the red fox is Vulpes vulpes") and thanks to Edward Johnston this script has enjoyed a revival in the 20th century.

Note: "Italic hand" (a semi-cursive script), "Italian hand" (a copperplate cursive script) and "Italic type" (a typeface) are different concepts.

=== Copperplate and cursive ===
From the italic scripts after the 16th century, more cursive forms evolved, known as Copperplate script due to way the calligraphy books were printed. These scripts reached their height in the 18–19th century. The main examples were the Italian hand and the English round-hand, which in Britain were taught to men and women respectively, these scripts feature flowing letters which could be written with a single pen lift (with the exception of x and the marks added after writing the word which were dots on i and j and the bar of the ascender of t) with straight or looped ascenders and descenders. In Italy, Italian hand is instead known as "posata" (posed).

Several national styles of cursive were developed, such as Spencerian Script in the US. Despite the recent decline, in several countries cursive scripts are still taught in schools today, often modified to be more similar to roman type letters (tailless z, w-like instead of a 90° CW turned s for w, capitals without "belly" or swashes, forward-facing capital F etc.).

== Diffusion ==
With the spread of Western Christianity the Latin alphabet spread to the peoples of northern Europe who spoke Germanic languages, displacing their earlier Runic alphabets, as well as to the speakers of Baltic languages, such as Lithuanian and Latvian, and several (non-Indo-European) Uralic languages, most notably Hungarian, Finnish and Estonian. During the Middle Ages the Latin alphabet also came into use among the peoples speaking West Slavic languages, including the ancestors of modern Poles, Czechs, Croats, Slovenes, and Slovaks, as these peoples adopted Roman Catholicism. Speakers of East Slavic languages generally adopted both Orthodox Christianity and Cyrillic script.

As late as 1492, the Latin alphabet was limited primarily to the languages spoken in western, northern and central Europe. The Orthodox Christian Slavs of eastern and southeastern Europe mostly used the Cyrillic alphabet, and the Greek alphabet was still in use by Greek-speakers around the eastern Mediterranean. The Arabic alphabet was widespread within Islam, both among Arabs and non-Arab nations like the Iranians, Indonesians, Malays, and Turkic peoples. Most of the rest of Asia used a variety of Brahmic alphabets or the Chinese script.

World distribution of the Latin alphabet. The blue areas show the countries where the Latin alphabet is the sole official script or most predominant writing system.

By the 18th century, the standard Latin alphabet, cemented by the rise of the printing press, comprised the 26 letters we are familiar with today, albeit in Romance languages the letter ⟨w⟩ was until the 19th century very rare.

During colonialism, the alphabet began its spread around the world, being employed for previously unwritten languages, notably in the wake of Christianization, being used in Bible translations. It spread to the Americas, Australia, and parts of Asia, Africa, and the Pacific, along with the Spanish, Portuguese, English, French, and Dutch languages.

In the late 18th century, the Romanians adopted the Latin alphabet; although Romanian is a Romance language, the Romanians were predominantly Orthodox Christians, and until the 19th century the Church used the Romanian Cyrillic alphabet. Vietnam, under French rule, adapted the Latin alphabet for Vietnamese, which had previously used Chinese characters. The Latin alphabet is also used for many Austronesian languages, including Tagalog and the other languages of the Philippines, and the official Malaysian and Indonesian, replacing earlier Arabic and Brahmic scripts.

In 1928, as part of Kemal Atatürk's reforms, Turkey adopted the Latin alphabet for the Turkish language, replacing the Arabic alphabet. Most of Turkic-speaking peoples of the former USSR, including Tatars, Bashkirs, Azeri, Kazakh, Kyrgyz and others, used the Uniform Turkic alphabet in the 1930s. In the 1940s all those alphabets were replaced by Cyrillic. After the collapse of the Soviet Union in 1991, several of the newly independent Turkic-speaking republics adopted the Latin alphabet, replacing Cyrillic. Azerbaijan, Uzbekistan, and Turkmenistan have officially adopted the Latin alphabet for Azeri, Uzbek, and Turkmen, respectively. In the 1970s, the People's Republic of China developed an official transliteration of Mandarin Chinese into the Latin alphabet, called Pinyin, used to aid children and foreigners in learning the pronunciation of Chinese characters. Aside from that, Chinese characters are used for reading and writing.

West Slavic and some South Slavic languages use the Latin alphabet rather than the Cyrillic, a reflection of the dominant religion practiced among those peoples. Among these, Polish uses a variety of diacritics and digraphs to represent special phonetic values, as well as l with stroke – ł – for a w-like sound. Czech uses diacritics as in Dvořák – the term háček ("little hook") is Czech. Croatian and the Latin version of Serbian use carons, or háčeks, in č, š, ž, an acute in ć and a bar in đ. The languages of Eastern Orthodox Slavs generally use Cyrillic instead which is much closer to the Greek alphabet. Serbian, however, actively uses both alphabets.

== See also ==
- History of the alphabet
- Scribal abbreviation
