= Fabius =

Legendary founder of the Roman gens Fabia

In Roman mythology, Fabius was the son of Hercules and an unnamed mother.

In "The Life of Fabius Maximus" from the Parallel Lives by Plutarch, Fabius, the first of his name, was the son of Hercules by a nymph or a woman native to the country, who consorted with Hercules by the River Tiber.

Silius Italicus, also chronicling the noble origins of Fabius Maximus, mentions in his poem Punica that Hercules lay with a daughter of King Evander of Pallantium and with her he fathered the first Fabius in the site where Rome would later be situated.

However, Dionysius of Halicarnassus mentions that the daughter of Evander with whom Hercules had a son, named Pallas, was Lavinia, although Pallas is more commonly considered Evander's son, as Virgil recounts in the Aeneid.

Fabius was the legendary founder of the family of the Fabii, one of the most ancient patrician families at ancient Rome, and that distinguished itself as warriors, politicians, religious, literati and artists.

The modern given name Fabio descends from the Latin Fabius.
