= Pallas (son of Evander) =

Character in Roman mythology

John Everett Millais – Aeneas Shown the Body of Pallas from Virgil's Aeneid

In Roman mythology, Pallas (/ˈpæləs/ PAL-əs; Ancient Greek: Πάλλας) was the son or grandson of King Evander.

In Virgil's Aeneid, Evander allows his son Pallas to fight against the Rutuli with Aeneas, who takes him and treats him like his own son Ascanius. In battle, Pallas proves he is a warrior, killing many Rutulians. Pallas is often compared to the Rutulian Lausus, son of Mezentius, who also dies young in battle. Tragically, however, Pallas is eventually killed by Turnus, who takes his sword-belt, which is decorated with the scene of the fifty slaughtered bridegrooms, as a spoil. Throughout the rest of Book X, Aeneas is filled with rage (furor) at the death of the youth, and he rushes through the Latin lines and mercilessly kills his way to Turnus. Turnus, however, is lured away by Juno so that he might be spared, and Aeneas kills Lausus, instead, which moves Aeneas to pity.

Pallas' body is carried on his shield back to Evander, who grieves at his loss. However, Pallas' story does not stop there – at the end of Book XII, as Turnus is finally defeated and begs for his life, Aeneas almost spares him, but catches sight of Pallas' baldric, Turnus' fateful spoils. This drives Aeneas into another murderous rage, and the epic ends as he kills Turnus in revenge for Pallas' death. There is an obvious similarity between the latter killing and Achilles killing Hector in revenge for the death of Patroclus in the Iliad.

A variant of the myth by Dionysius of Halicarnassus says that Pallas was the son of Hercules by Lavinia, daughter of Evander, rather than the son of the latter, although, according to Silius Italicus, Evander's grandson born to Hercules was called Fabius.
