= Erulus =

In Vergil's Aeneid, Erulus is a king of Praeneste. At birth, he was given three souls (animae) by his mother, the goddess Feronia, who also tripled his ability to defend himself by giving him three sets of arms.

Vergil tells his story through the Arcadian king Evander, founder of Pallantium, who allies with the Trojan immigrants led by Aeneas. Evander regrets that the frailty of old age keeps him from fighting at Aeneas's side, and reminisces about the warrior deeds of his youth:

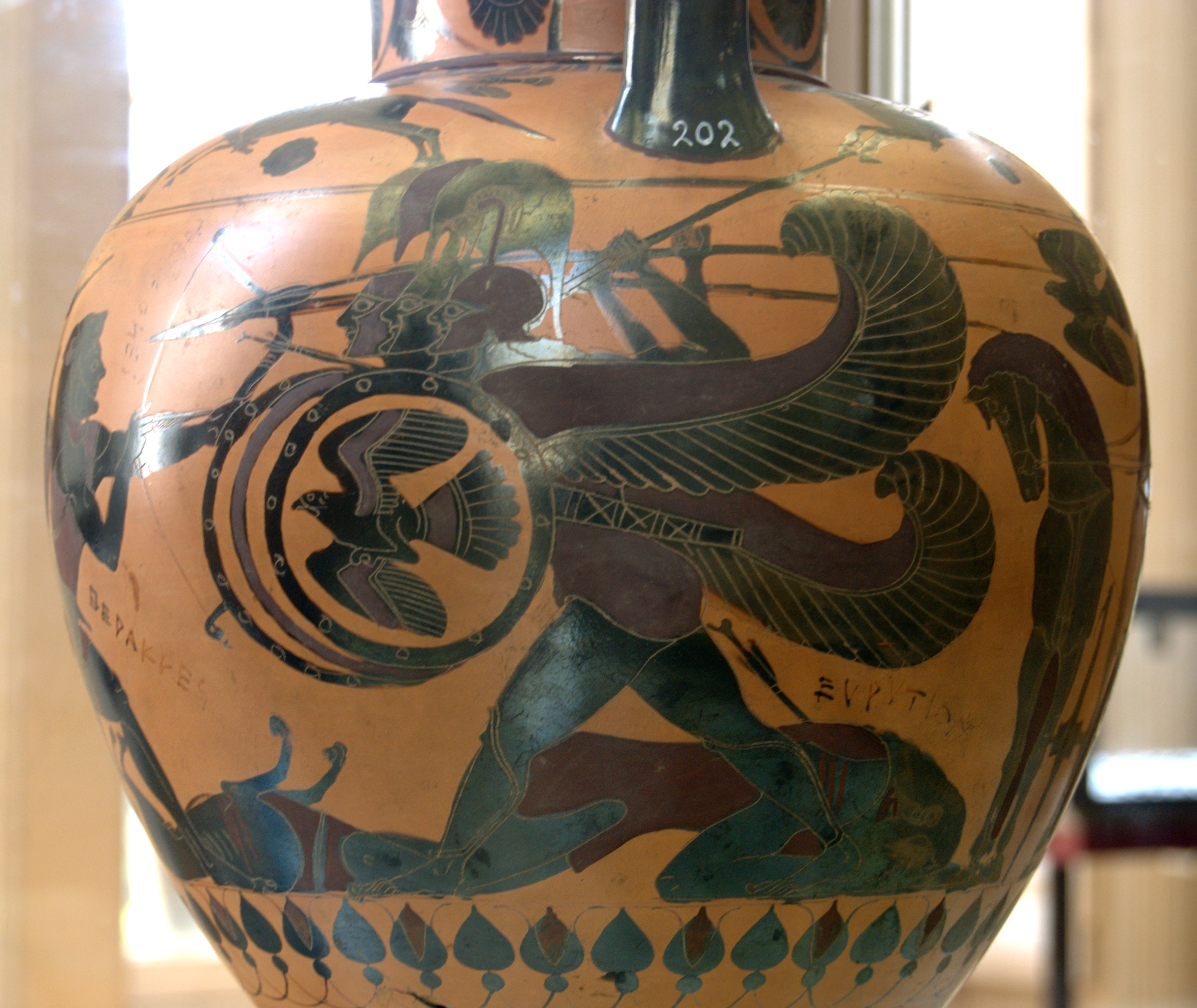
A Southern Italian amphora (6th-century BC) depicting the triple-warrior Geryon, after whom Vergil may have modeled Erulus

If only Jupiter would give me back
The past years and the man I was, when I
Cut down the front rank by Praeneste wall
And won the fight and burned the piles of shields!
I had dispatched to Hell with this right hand
King Erulus, to whom Feronia,
His mother, gave three lives at birth—a thing
To chill the blood—three sets of arms to fight with,
So that he had to be brought down three times.
Yet this hand took his lives that day, took all,
And each time took his arms …

No other literary source mentions Erulus; he may be Vergil's pure invention, based on the mythological figure Geryon, or given that his mother's cult is represented only sparsely in literary sources, he may belong to an archaic tradition to which no other reference survives. Some scholars have seen Erulus as an influence on Spenser's conception of Triamond's three-fold life in The Faerie Queene.
