= Lausus =

Son of Mezentius in the Aeneid

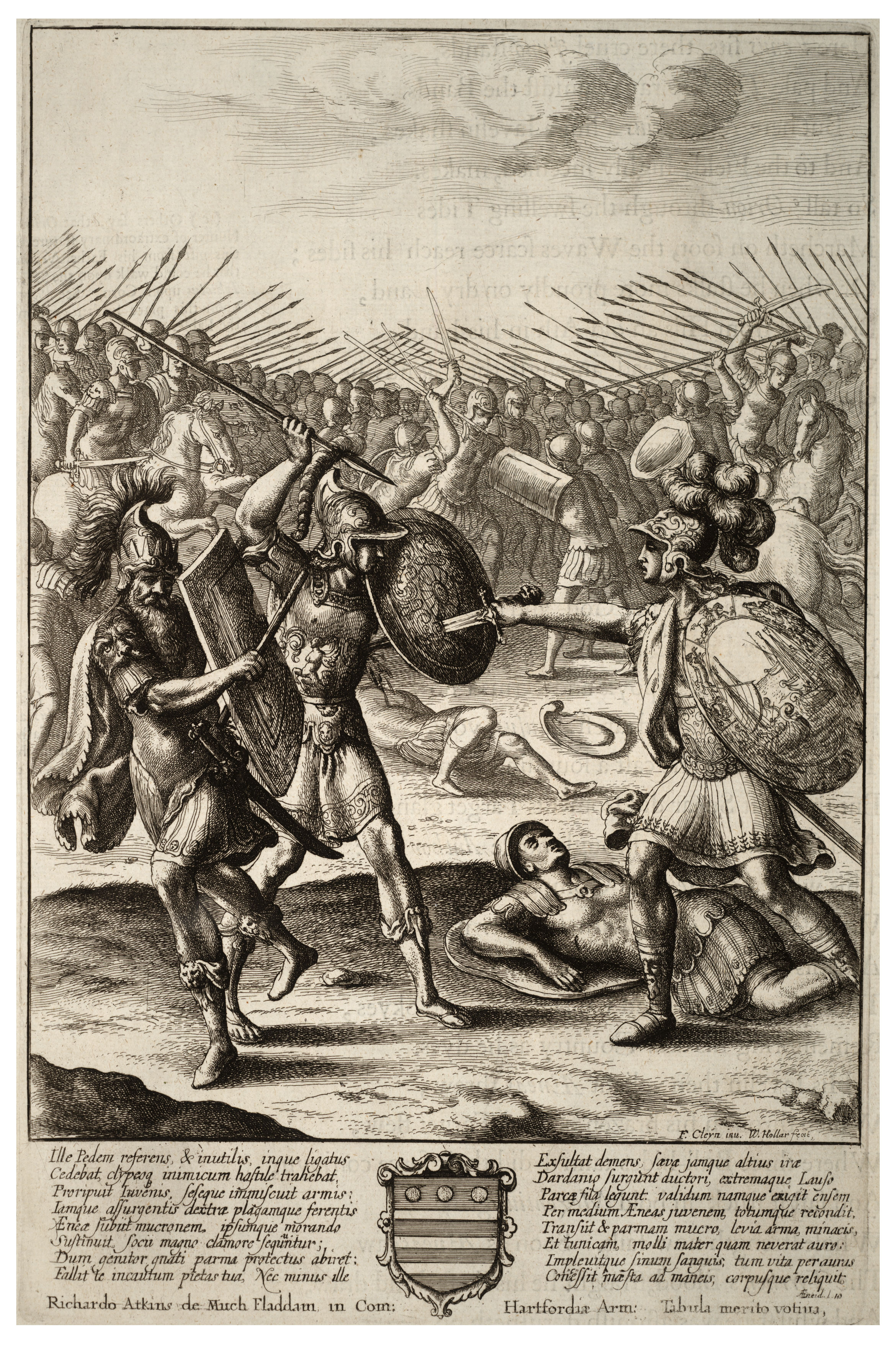
Aeneas' fight against Mezentius and Lausus, by Wenceslaus Hollar.

Lausus was the son of the ousted Etruscan king Mezentius, and fought with him against Aeneas and the Trojans in Italy. He appears in Virgil's Aeneid in Books VII and X. When his father is wounded by Aeneas, Lausus steps in between them, and Aeneas strikes them down. In doing so, Lausus embodies the idea of pietas that Virgil praises throughout, exemplified in the relationships of Anchises and Aeneas and of Pallas and Evander. Aeneas immediately feels remorse for having killed the boy, and reproaches Lausus' men for keeping a distance rather than caring for the body: "Then to the stripling's tardy followers / he sternly called, and lifted from the earth / with his own hand the fallen foe: dark blood / defiled those princely tresses braided fair."

Lausus is considered a foil to Pallas, the son of King Evander: both are young, come down from royal blood, are handsome, strong, full of filial piety, and both die at the hands of greater heroes.
