= Cacus =

Figure in Greek and Roman mythology

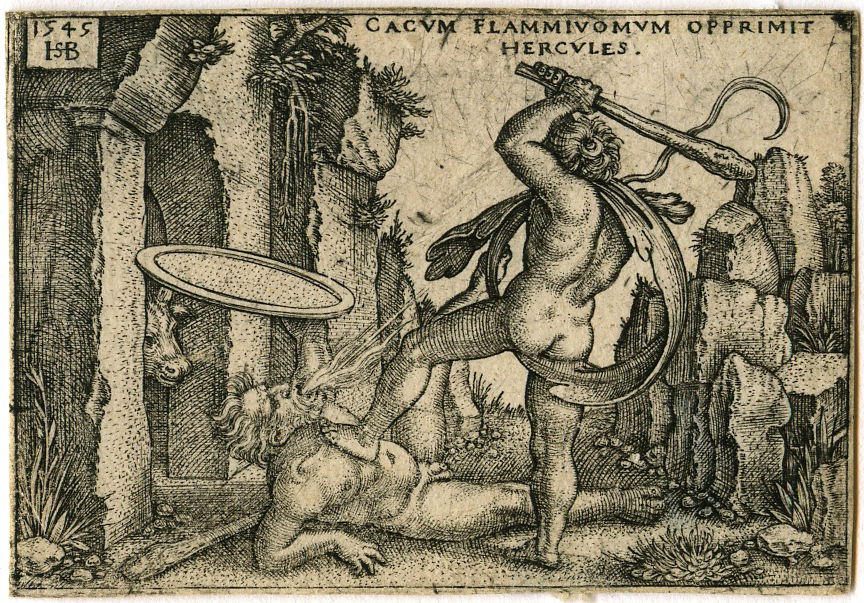
Hercules killing the fire-breathing Cacus, engraving by Sebald Beham (1545)

In Roman mythology, Cacus (Ancient Greek: Κάκος, derived from κακός, meaning "bad") was a fire-breathing giant and the son of Vulcan (Plutarch called him son of Hephaestus). He was killed by Hercules after terrorizing the Aventine Hill before the founding of Rome.

== Mythology ==
Cacus lived in a cave in Italy on the future site of Rome. To the horror of nearby inhabitants, Cacus lived on human flesh and would nail the heads of victims to the doors of his cave. He was eventually overcome by Hercules.

According to Solinus, Cacus lived in a place called Salinae, which later became the location of the Porta Trigemina.

Evander of Pallantium recounts the story of Cacus in Virgil's Aeneid According to Evander, Hercules stopped to pasture the cattle he had stolen from Geryon near Cacus' lair. As Hercules slept, the monster took a liking to the cattle and slyly stole eight of them – four bulls and four cows – by dragging them by their tails, so as to leave a trail in the wrong direction. When Hercules awoke and made to leave, the remaining herd made plaintive noises towards the cave, and a single cow lowed in reply.

Angered, Hercules stormed towards the cave. A terrified Cacus blocked the entrance with a vast, immoveable boulder (though some accounts have Hercules himself block the entrance) forcing Hercules to tear at the top of the mountain to reach his adversary. Cacus attacked Hercules by spewing fire and smoke while Hercules responded with tree branches and rocks the size of millstones. Eventually losing patience, Hercules leapt into the cave, aiming for the area with the thickest smoke. Hercules grabbed Cacus and strangled the monster, and was praised throughout the land for his act. According to Virgil in Book VIII of the Aeneid, Hercules grasped Cacus so tightly that Cacus' eyes popped out and there was no blood left in his throat: et angit inhaerens elisos oculos et siccum sanguine guttur.

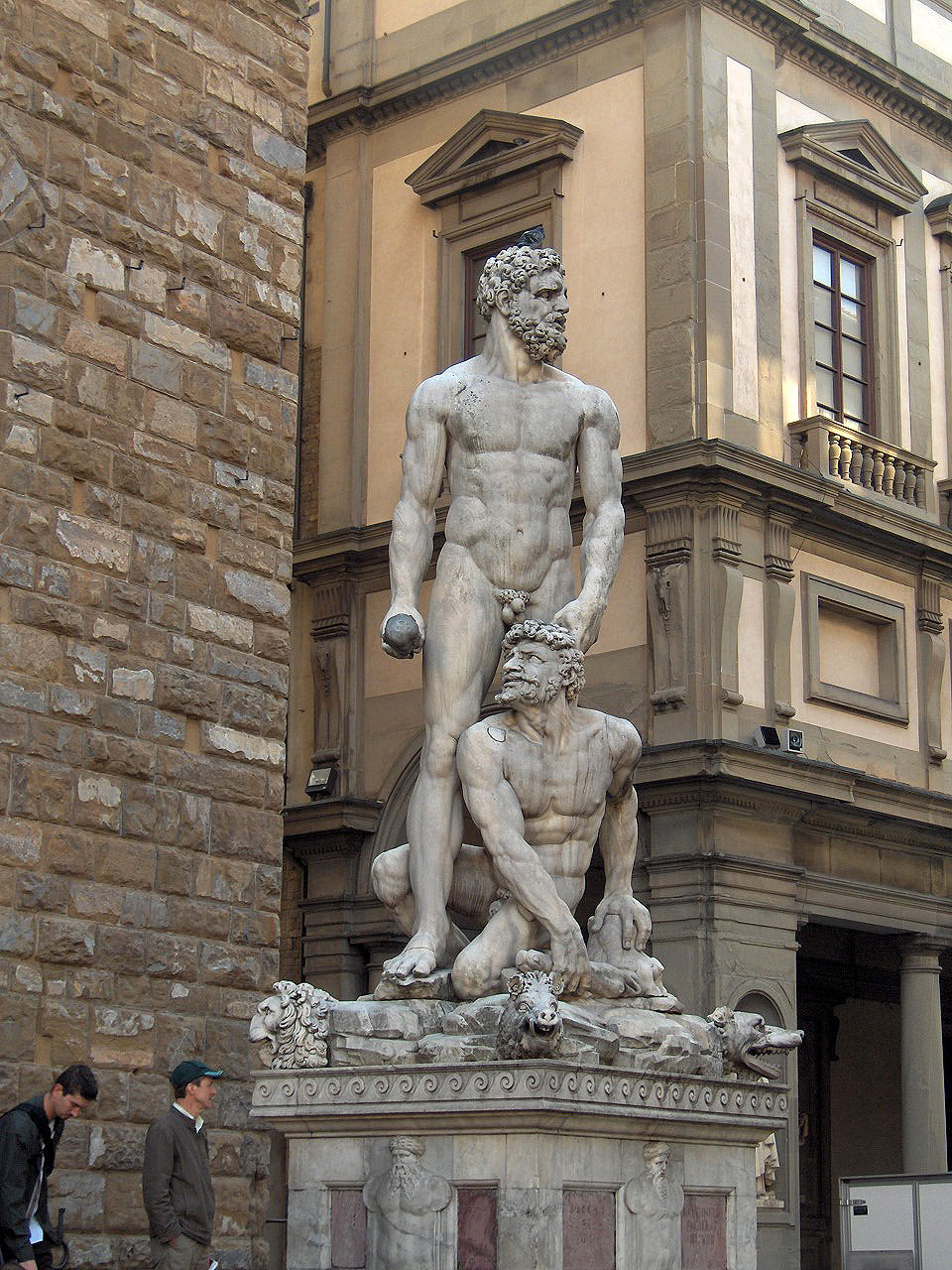
Hercules and Cacus by Baccio Bandinelli (1525–34); (Palazzo Vecchio, Florence)

Another version of the myth states that Cacus made the cattle walk backwards so they left a false trail. Hercules drove his remaining cattle past a cave, where Cacus was hiding the stolen ones, and they began calling out to each other. Alternatively, Caca, Cacus' sister, told Hercules where her brother was.

According to Dionysius of Halicarnassus, when the Aborigines and the Arcadians who lived at Pallantium learned of the death of Cacus and saw Hercules, they thought themselves very fortunate in being rid of the former, they were plucking branches of laurel, crowned both him and themselves with it and their kings invite Hercules to be their guest.

In the Roman tradition, Hercules founded an altar after he killed Cacus. Eusebius writes that Heracles erected an altar to commemorate his killing of Cacus. This was the Ara Maxima, where later the Forum Boarium, the cattle market of Rome, took place. In the Aeneid, the Arcadian King Evander recounts this story to Aeneas to explain the rites the people perform yearly to Hercules. Hercules had temples in the area, including the still extant Temple of Hercules Victor.

== In later literature ==
- In the Inferno of the Divine Comedy by Dante Alighieri, Cacus is depicted as a centaur with a fire-breathing dragon on his shoulders and snakes covering his equine back. He guards over the thieves in the Thieves section of Hell's Circle of Fraud.
- In the second book of Gargantua and Pantagruel, Cacus is said to be begotten by Polyphemus the Cyclops. He is also said to be the giant who fathered Etion.
- Miguel de Cervantes in his 1605 novel Don Quixote describes the inn keeper in the second chapter of part one "The First Sally from his Native Heath" as "No less a thief than Cacus himself, and as full of tricks as a student or a page boy." Cervantes also mentions Cacus as a prototypical thief in a comparison in the sixth chapter of Don Quixote part one, "The Scrutiny of the Curate and the Barber" when the Curate says "Here we have Sir Rindaldo of Montalbán with his friends and companions, bigger thieves than Cacus, all of them ..." The comparison is a slight on Rinaldo, as he had written a book The Mirror of Chivalry which the Curate and the Barber agree caused, in part, Don Quixote's descent into madness.
- In A Letter to a Friend Sir Thomas Browne compares the reluctance with which old people go to the grave with the backwards movements of Cacus' oxen.
- Cacus is described as a deformed outcast from an Italian village, able only to say "Cacus", in Steven Saylor's novel Roma, playing a direct role in the events of the main character of the era.
- Lavinia, in Ursula K. Le Guin's 2008 novel Lavinia, describes Cacus as a "fire lord, the chief man of a tribal settlement, who kept Vesta alight for the people of the neighborhood, with the help of his daughters." Lavinia comments that the Greeks' story of the beast-man "was more exciting than mine."
- Cacus appears as the main antagonist in Rick Riordan's short story in The Demigod Diaries titled "The Staff of Hermes". There were references to Cacus' fight with Hercules in that story. In the story, Cacus had stolen Hermes' Caduceus. He later attacked Percy Jackson and Annabeth Chase. Annabeth hit Cacus with her metal claw and Percy killed Cacus with Hermes' Caduceus.

== In modern languages ==
In the Spanish language, the derived form caco is a colloquial word for "thief" and a disused word for a very cowardly man.
