= Sacellum =

Small shrine in ancient Roman religion

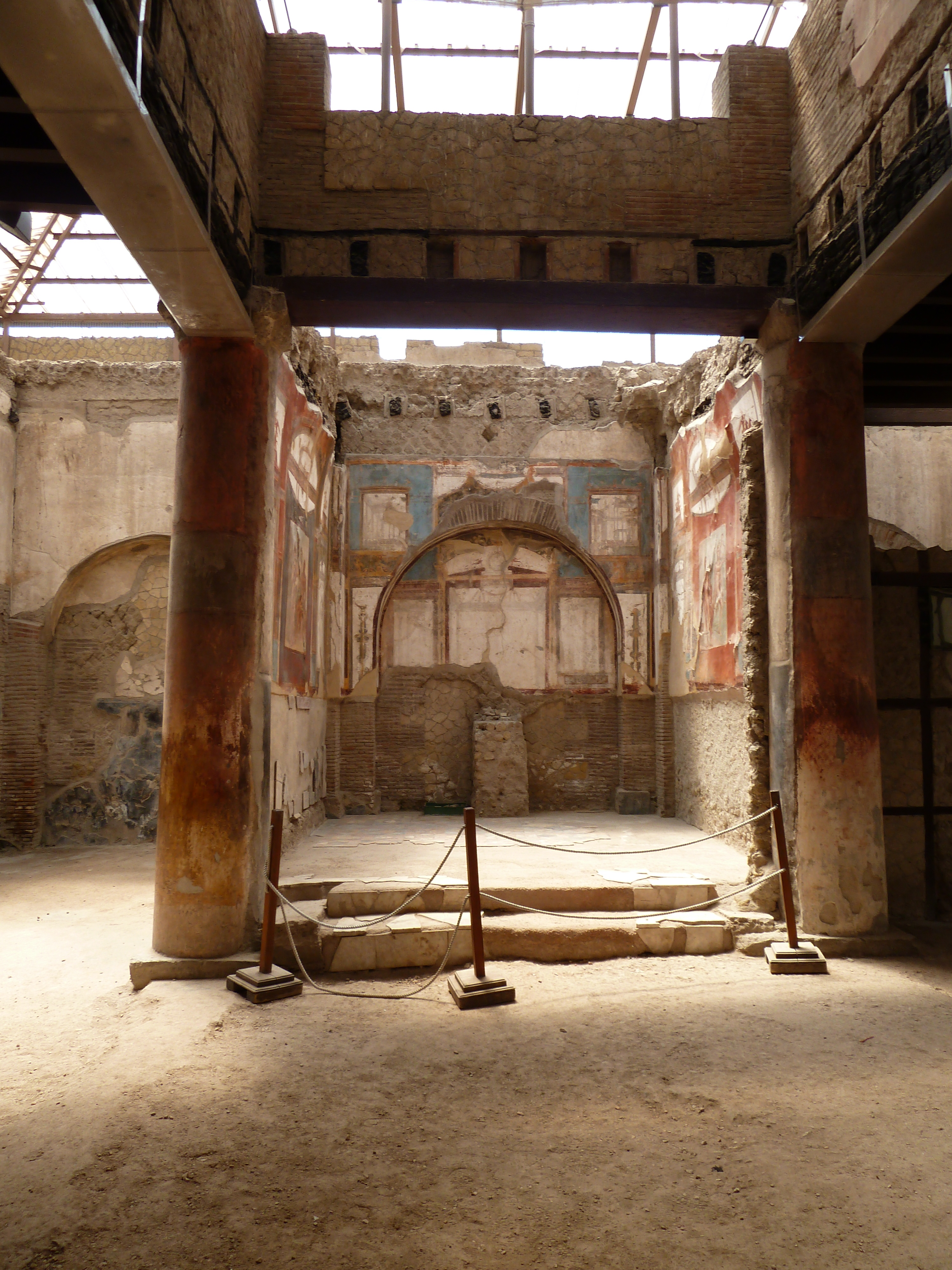
Sacello degli Augustali (Ins VI). Shrine (sacellum).

A sacellum is a small shrine in ancient Roman religious contexts. The word is a diminutive of sacrum (neuter of sacer, "belonging to a god"). The numerous sacella of ancient Rome included both shrines maintained on private properties by families, and public ones. A sacellum might be square or round.

Varro and Verrius Flaccus describe sacella in ways that at first seem contradictory, the former defining a sacellum in its entirety as equivalent to a cella, which is specifically an enclosed space, and the latter insisting that a sacellum had no roof. "Enclosure", however, is the shared characteristic, roofed over or not. "The sacellum", notes Jörg Rüpke, "was both less complex and less elaborately defined than a temple proper".

The meaning can overlap with that of sacrarium, a place where sacred objects (sacra) were stored or deposited for safekeeping. The sacella of the Argei, for instance, are also called sacraria. In private houses, the sacrarium was the part of the house where the images of the Penates were kept; the lararium was a form of sacrarium for the Lares. Both sacellum and sacrarium passed into Christian usage.

Other Latin words for temple or shrine are aedes, aedicula, fanum, delubrum and templum, though this last word encompasses the whole religiously sanctioned precinct.

== Cult maintenance of sacella ==
Each curia had its own sacellum overseen by the celeres, originally the bodyguard of the king, who preserved a religious function in later times. These were related to the ritual of the Argei, but probably there were other rites connected with these sacella.

A case tried in September 50 BC indicates that a public sacellum might be encompassed by a private property, with the expectation that it remain open to the public. It was alleged that the defendant, Ap. Claudius Pulcher, a censor at the time, had failed to maintain public access to a sacellum on his property.

=== List of public sacella and sacraria ===
The following is an incomplete list of deities or groups of deities who had a known sacellum or sacrarium in the city of Rome.

- Sacellum of Janus, supposed to have been built by Romulus, which was square, contained the god's image, and had two gates.
- Sacellum of the Lares, one of four points in the sacred boundary of Rome (pomerium) as established by Romulus.
- Sacrarium of Mars, which held the spear of Mars, in the Regia.
- Sacellum or aedes of Hercules, in the Forum Boarium.
- Sacellum of Caca, the sister of Cacus whom Hercules defeated.
- Sacella or sacraria of the Argei
- Sacellum of Diana, on the lesser Caelian Hill, where a number of senators offered annual sacrifices.
- Sacellum or delubrum of Minerva capta, "Captive Minerva", a shrine on the Caelian Hill that contained a statue of Minerva plundered from Falerii when that city was taken by the Romans in 241 BC.
- Sacellum of Jupiter Fagutalis, in the Lucus Fagutalis ("Beech Grove") on the Esquiline Hill.
- Sacellum of Naenia;
- Sacellum of Pudicitia Patricia.
- Sacellum of Dea Murcia, at the foot of the Aventine Hill.

== Provincial and later usage ==
In a manuscript from the Abbey of Saint Gall, sacellum is glossed as Old Irish nemed, Gaulish nemeton, originally a sacred grove or space defined for religious purposes, and later a building used for such. In Christian architecture, rooflessness ceases to be a defining characteristic and the word may be applied to a small chapel marked off by a screen from the main body of a church, while an Italian sacello may alternatively be a small chapel or oratory which stands as a building in its own right.
