= Cimmerian Sibyl =

Oracular woman in Cimmerium, Italy

Cimmerian Sibyl by Guercino.

The Cimmerian Sibyl, by name Carmentis, was the prophetic priestess presiding over the Apollonian Oracle at Cimmerium in Italy, near Lake Avernus, Cumae area.

== Background ==
The word Sibyl comes (via Latin) from the ancient Greek word sibylla, meaning prophetess. There were many sibyls in the ancient world (e.g., Samian, Cumaean), but the Cimmerian Sibyl was venerated by the pre-Hellenic native populations.

The Cimmerian Sibyl may have been a doublet for the Cumaean since the designation Cimmerian refers to priestesses who lived underground near Lake Avernus. An oracular shrine dedicated to Apollo, as at Delphi, stood on the Acropolis of Cumae. An underground Roman road ran from the southeastern part of Cumae, through Mount Grillo to the shores of Lake Avernus. However, there are sources that distinguished the two Sibyls, such as those that noted it was the Cumaean and not the Cimmerian Sibyl who offered King Tarquin her book of prophecies.

== Accounts ==
The Sibyl was mentioned by the Campanian playwright Naevius in his play Carmen belli penici written between 235 and 204 BC. This is one of the earliest references of the Italian Sibyl. Naevius also named the Cimmerian Sibyl in his books of the Punic War and Piso in his annals (Varro in Lactantius Inst. 1.6.9). An account also cited that it was the dramatist who accompanied Aeneas in the late third century B.C. when he visited the Cimmerian Sibyl.

The prophetess was also cited in an encyclopedia called Liber Floridus attributed to Lambert of St. Omer, where the Sibyl was distinguished from the Samian Sibyl. She was identified in this text as "India" while the latter was called "Phemonoe."

The Sibyl's son Evander founded in Rome the first shrine of Pan which is called the Lupercal or Lupercum.
