= Carmenta =

Roman goddess of childbirth and prophecy

- Goddess of childbirth and prophecy, protector of mothers and children, patron of midwives, inventor of the alphabet
- Member of the Camenae
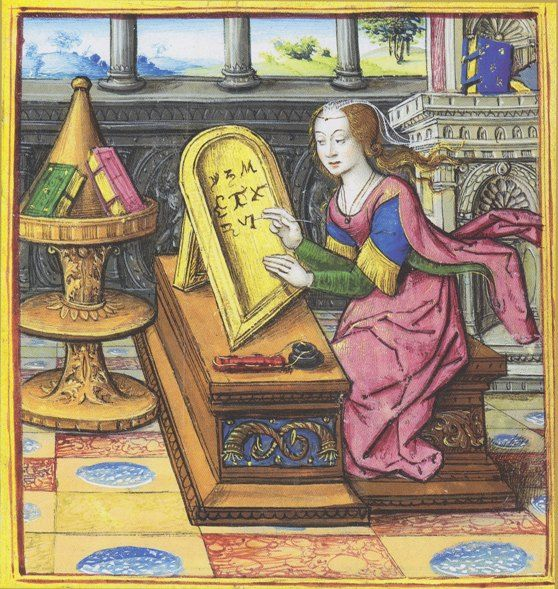
- Nicostrata-Carmenta inventing the Latin alphabet (Antoine Dufour, 1504)
- Other names: Nicostrate
- Major cult center: a shrine near the Porta Carmentalis
- Gender: female
- Festivals: Carmentalia
- Offspring: Evander of Pallantium

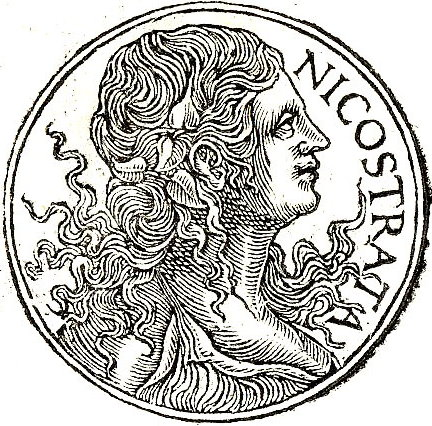
Carmenta as Nicostrate/Nicostrata

In ancient Roman religion and myth, Carmenta (Greek) or Carmentis (Latin) was a goddess of childbirth and prophecy, associated with technological innovation, specifically, the invention or adaptation of the Latin alphabet as well as the protection of mothers and children and a patron of midwives.

== Background ==
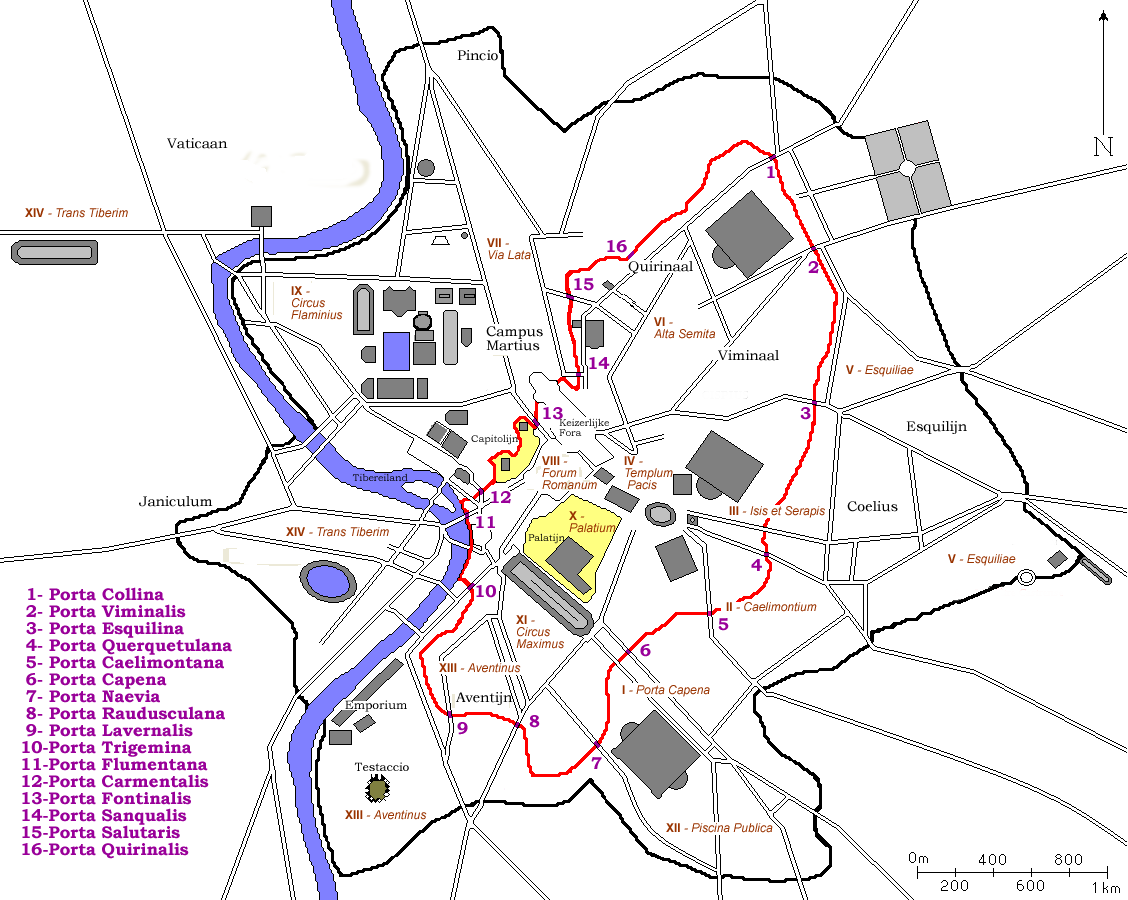
Porta Carmentalis (at location 12)

The name Carmenta is generally derived from the Latin carmen, meaning a spell, oracle, or song, a term that is also the root of the English word “charm.” Her original name was Nicostrate (Greek: Νικοστράτη, "victory-army"), but it was changed later to honor her renown for giving oracles (Latin singular: carmen). She was the mother of Evander of Pallene (fathered by Hermes) and, along with other Greek followers, they founded the town of Pallantium which later was one of the sites of the start of Rome. Gaius Julius Hyginus (Fab. 277) mentions the legend that it was she who altered fifteen letters of the Greek alphabet to become the Latin alphabet which her son Evander introduced into Latium. Carmenta was one of the Camenae and the Cimmerian Sibyl. The leader of her cult was called the flamen carmentalis.

It was forbidden to wear leather or other forms of dead skin in her temple, which was next to the Porta Carmentalis, and close to the Theater of Marcellus in Rome. Her festival, called the Carmentalia, was celebrated primarily by women on January 11 and January 15. She is remembered in De Mulieribus Claris, a collection of biographies of historical and mythological women by the Florentine author Giovanni Boccaccio, composed in 1361–62. It is notable as the first collection devoted exclusively to biographies of women in Western literature.

== See also ==
- Theodontius
