= Argei =

Ancient Roman religious rituals

The rituals of the Argei were archaic religious observances in ancient Rome that took place on March 16 and March 17, and again on May 14 or May 15. By the time of Augustus, the meaning of these rituals had become obscure even to those who practiced them. For the May rites, a procession of pontiffs, Vestals, and praetors made its way around a circuit of 27 stations (sacella or sacraria), where at each they retrieved a figure fashioned into human form from rush, reed, and straw, resembling men tied hand and foot. After all the stations were visited, the procession, accompanied by the Flaminica Dialis in mourning guise, moved to the Pons Sublicius, the oldest known bridge in Rome, where the gathered figures were tossed into the Tiber River.

Both the figures (effigies or simulacra) and the stations or shrines were called Argei, the etymology of which remains undetermined.

The continuation of these rites into the later historical period when they were no longer understood demonstrates how strongly traditionalist the Romans were in matters of religion.

== Interpretations ==
Before the ritual commenced, an effigy was placed in each of the 27 (or in some sources 24 or 30) shrines of the Argei (sacra Argeorum) throughout the Servian regions. The effigies were thought to absorb pollution within the area, and their subsequent sacrifice was a ritual purification of the city. The pontiffs and Vestals were the main celebrants. The exact route of the procession among the stations is unclear.

According to Ovid, the ritual had been established as a sacrifice to the god Saturn as the result of a responsum from Jupiter Fatidicus, the oracle of Dodona. But the meaning of the ritual had already become obscure, and Ovid offers an antiquarian range of explanations. The responsum had prescribed human sacrifice, one man for each one of the gentes (families or clans) living near the banks of the Tiber. This early population was believed to have been of Greek origin, and hence Argei derived from Argivi (the Greek ethnonym "Argives"), specifically the companions of Evander and later those of Hercules who had decided to stay on and live there. This responsum predated the founding of Rome. One way to interpret the ritual of the Argei was that early inhabitants of what was to become Rome had practiced human sacrifice as prescribed; Ovid insists, however, that Hercules had put an end to it, and that human sacrifice was never a practice of the Romans themselves.

Ovid puts another interpretation in the mouth of Tiberinus, the god who personified the river. Since these early inhabitants were of Greek origin, he said, they grew homesick in their old age and asked to be buried in the river as a kind of symbolic return to their homeland in death. While this last interpretation appears irreconcilable with the previous, it may be reminiscent of burial practices in water which are attested in many parts of the world among primitive peoples.

Dionysius of Halicarnassus also explains the ritual in terms of human sacrifice, saying that Tiberinus was the recipient of these regular offerings.

Alternative modern interpretations include a pre-Imperial rainmaking rite, or an annual re-enactment of the execution by drowning of 27 Greek war captives.

== See also ==
- Navigium Isidis
