= Befana =

Figure in Italian folklore

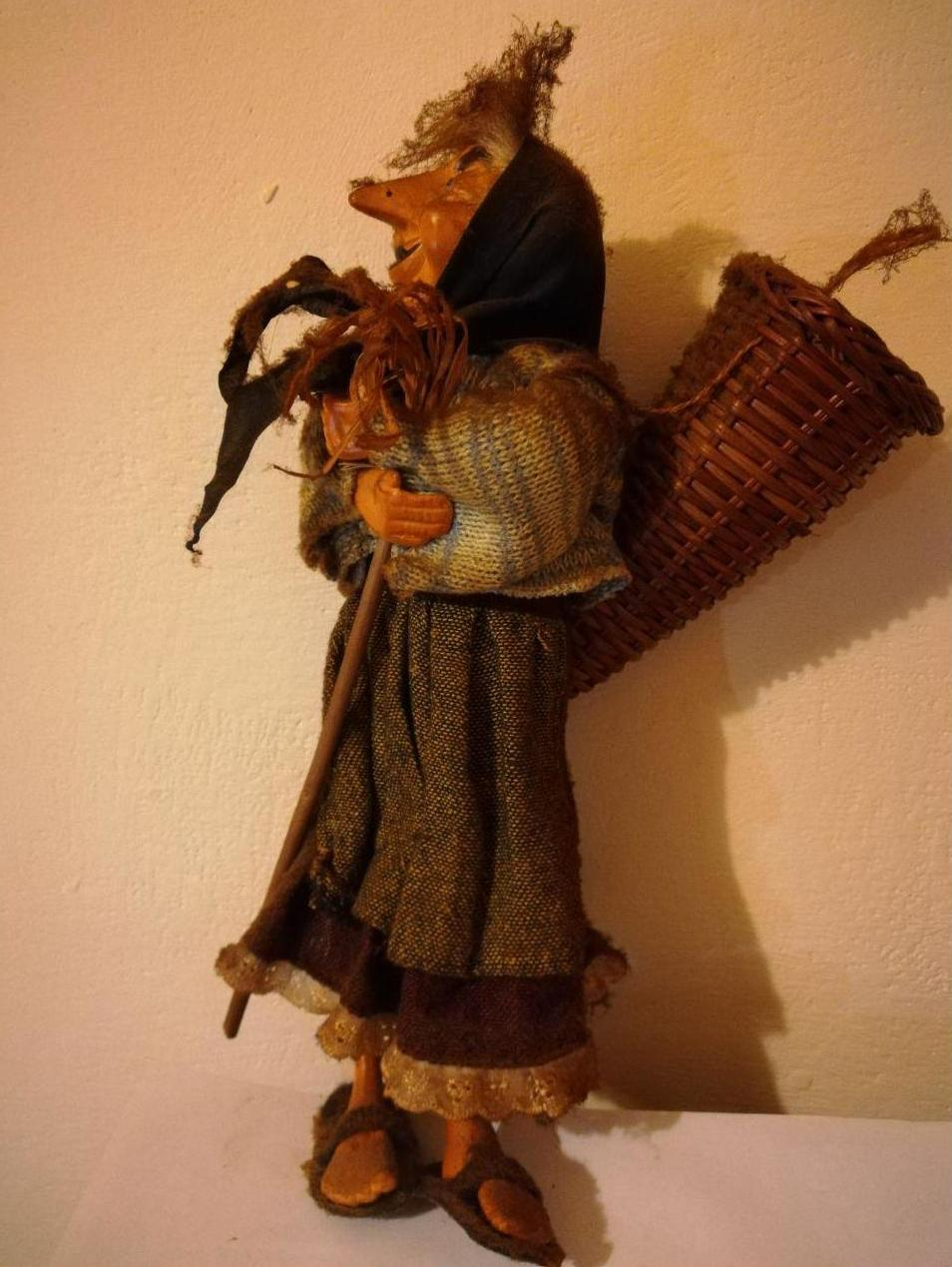
A wooden puppet depicting the Befana

In Italian folklore and folk customs, the Befana (Italian: [beˈfaːna]) is a witch-like old woman who delivers gifts to children throughout Italy on Epiphany Eve (the night of January 5) in a similar way to Santa Claus or the Three Magi. The Befana is a widespread tradition among Italians and thus has many names. She is a part of both popular national culture and traditional folk culture and is akin to other figures who roam about sometime during the Twelve Days and reward the good, punish the bad, and receive offerings. The Befana is a mysterious, contradictory figure of unclear origins. This character is enhanced by the fact that she is overall neglected by scholars but is the subject of much speculation by the ones who do mention her. Pre-Christian, Christian, and syncretism of the two have all been postulated as explanations of her origins. In some parts of Italy, especially Central Italy, mumming takes place on Epiphany Eve. Dolls are made of her and effigies are burnt and bonfires are often lit. She brings gifts to good children, typically sweets, candies or toys, but coal to bad children. She is usually portrayed as a hag riding a broomstick through the air while wearing a black shawl. She is covered in soot because she enters the children's houses through the chimney. She is often smiling and carries a bag or hamper filled with candy, gifts, or both. She is not only loved but also feared and mocked, particularly by children.

== Names and etymology ==
A popular belief is that her name derives from the Feast of Epiphany (Italian: Festa dell'Epifania). Many people believe that the name Befana is derived from the Italian version of the Greek word epifania or epiphaneia (Greek, επιφάνεια = appearance, surface; English: epiphany) and this is the most popular theory. Others posit, however, that the name is a derivative of bastrina, the gifts associated with the goddess Strina. In the book Domestic Life in Palestine, by Mary E. Rogers (Poe & Hitchcock, 1865) the author notes:

But an 'Essay on the Fine Arts', by E. L. Tarbuck, led me to believe that this custom is a relic of pagan worship, and that the word "Bastrina" refers to the offerings which used to be made to the goddess Strenia. We could hardly expect that the pagans who embraced Christianity could altogether abandon their former creeds and customs. Macaulay says, "Christianity conquered paganism, but paganism infected Christianity; the rites of the Pantheon passed into her 'worship, and the subtlities of the Academy into her creed'". Many pagan customs were adopted by the new Church. T. Hope, in his 'Essay on Architecture', says: 'The Saturnalia were continued in the Carnival, and the festival with offerings to the goddess Strenia was continued in that of the New Year ...'

The Befana is known by several other names throughout Italy as demonstrated by Alfredo Cattabiani, some of them dialectal variants of the Standard Italian "old woman" (vecchia) or "witch" (strega):

But the figure of the old woman who brings gifts is not only Roman: she is called, for example, the Vecchia [Old Woman] in Pavia, the Pifanie [Epiphany] in Lario Orientale, the Vecia [Old Woman] or Stria [Witch] in Mantua, Padua, Treviso, and Verona, the Pasquetta [Little Easter] in Legnago, in Venice Marantega or Redodesa, a name that is also found in the Belluno Alps with the variants Redosega, Redosola and Redosa; the Sibilia [Sybil] in Pirano, the Donnazza [Woman?] in Borca di Cadore, the Anguana [Serpent?] in Cortina d'Ampezzo and the Berola in the province of Treviso, the Vecie [Old Woman] or the Strie [Witch] or the Femenate or the Marangule in Friuli. In Modena she is Barbasa, in Piacenza she is Mara, and the Voecia [Old Woman] in Bologna. (Note: Ma la figura della vecchia che porta i regali non è soltanto romana: è detta, per esempio, la Vecchia a Pavia, la Pifanie a Lario Orientale, la Vecia o la Stria a Mantova, Padova, Treviso e Verona, la Pasquetta a Legnago, a Venezia Marantega o Redodesa, nome che si ritrova anche nelle Alpi bellunesi con le varianti Redosega, Redosola e Redosa; la Sibilia a Pirano, la Donnazza a Borca di Cadore, l’Anguana a Cortina d’Ampezzo e la Berola in provincia di Treviso, la Vecie o la Strie o la Femenate o la Marangule nel Friuli. A Modena è la Barbasa, a Piacenza la Mara, la Voecia a Bologna.)

Italian folklorist Giuseppe Pitrè also calls her Carcavecchia and the old woman of Christmas, (Note: la vecchia Befana, la Carcavecchia, la vecchia di Natale,) the latter of which is Sicilian. The associated mumming custom also goes by different names in different regions of Italy. In Tuscany it is called the Befanata. It is called the Pasquella in Umbria, Lazio, Marche, Emilia-Romagna, and Abruzzo. It is also known as the Pasquarella in Abruzzo. Both of these latter names are derived from the Italian word for Easter Pasqua borrowed straight from the Hebrew Pesach.

== Origin ==
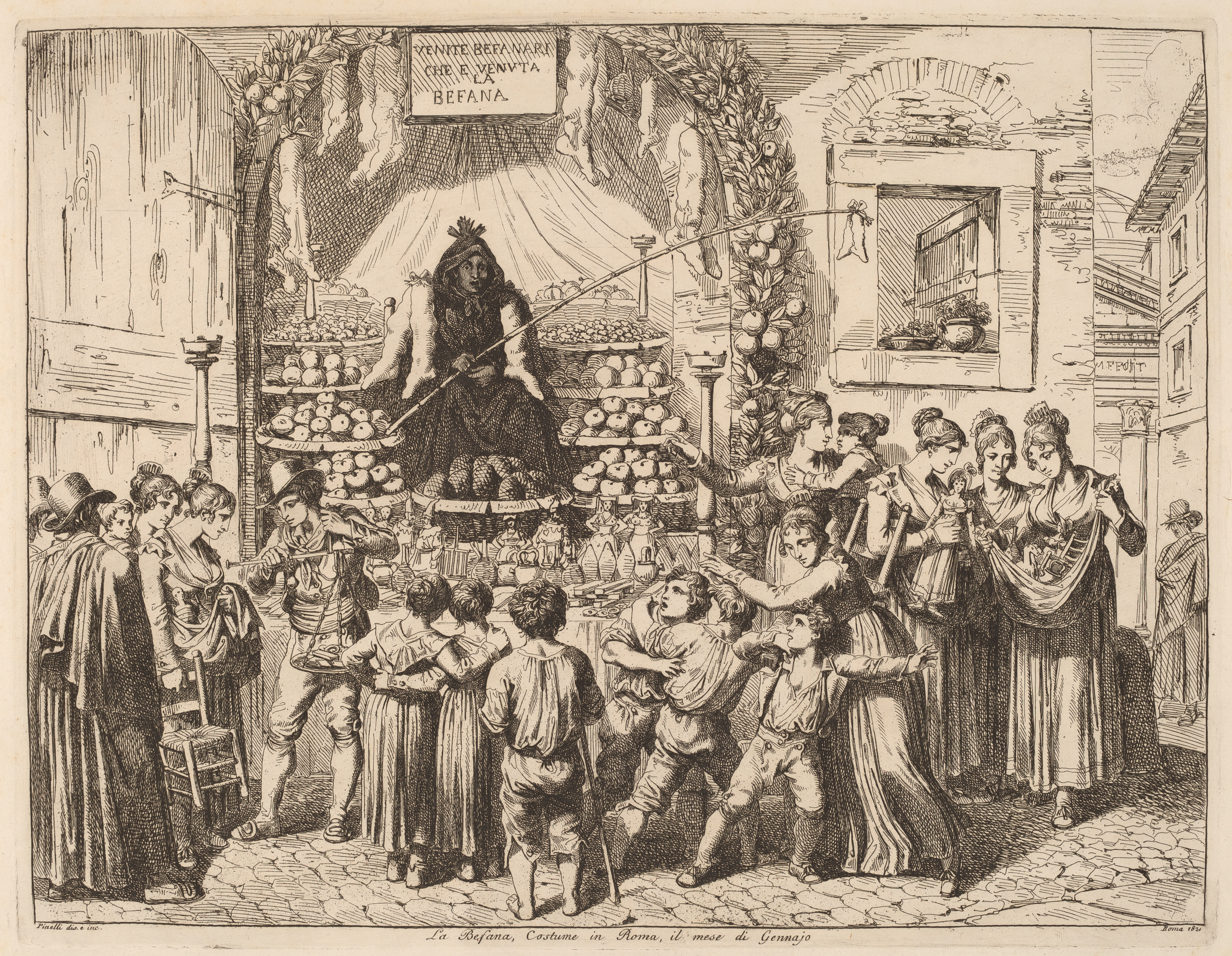
La Befana by Bartolomeo Pinelli (1821)

Written records of the Befana and Befanata date to the Middle Ages. Her origins are the subject of speculation by scholars who have variously proposed they lie in paganism, Christianity, or a mix of the two. John B. Smith said she, like her High German counterpart Perchta, is nothing more than the personification of Epiphany invented by medieval Christians who had a tendency to personify feast and fast days while Jacob Grimm found it not credible that two separate cultures would personify a feast day as a supernatural figure ("a name in the calendar had caused the invention of a supernatural being") and concluded it was far more likely that the Befana and Perchta were pre-Christian in origin and that they blended with the Christian holiday name. It has been pointed out that there was "a clear attempt to Christianize the disturbing female character by transforming her into the female personification of the feast." Generally the pre-Christian origin is the one most proposed and the Befana is often said to be a goddess or the remnant of one, though what culture and time period she comes from has been less uniform. Cultures that have been proposed include Roman, Celtic, Neolithic farmers, and Paleolithic hunter-gatherers.

== Appearance and behavior ==
In traditional Italian iconography, she is portrayed as having ember eyes, sharp feline teeth, a sharp and cutting tongue, and a sooty face from the chimneys she enters houses through. (Note: La Befana, che nell’iconografia tradizionale appare come una vecchia col viso fuligginoso, gli occhi di brace, i denti felini e affilati, la lingua aguzza e tagliente . . . e scende per la cappa del camino nel focolare . . .) She is also described as an "ugly, toothless old woman". Grimm described her as a misshapen fairy. She is said to wear rags, a headscarf, and carries a broom and a sack or a basket in which she keeps her gifts.

Once a year on the night of January 5, she leaves the mountain caves where she is said to live and flies through the air, riding her broom backwards, to bring toys or candy to good children and coal or cinders to naughty children in all of Italy. (Note: . . . abita secondo la leggenda nelle caverne delle montagne e una volta all’anno, nella notte fra il 5 e il 6 gennaio, arriva di notte, a cavallo di una magica scopa che inforca al contrario . . . portando piccoli doni ai bambini buoni e, secondo l’interpretazione pedagogica corrente, carbone per i più capricciosi.) In many poorer parts of Italy and in particular rural Sicily, a stick in a stocking was placed instead of coal. Being a good housekeeper, many say she will sweep the floor before she leaves. To some the sweeping means the sweeping away of the problems of the year.

Children must not watch her as she visits and delivers items or they are in serious danger (Note: È una figura non solo misteriosa, ma pericolosa se non si rispetta la sua invisibilità: chi incautamente volesse sorprenderla mentre deposita i doni incorrerebbe in gravi pericoli. A Roma, dove familiarmente hanno immaginato la sua casa fra i tetti di piazza Navona . . .) as she does not like to be watched. Another, sanitized version says that if the Befana catches someone watching her, they will receive a playful thump on the shoulder from her broomstick. This aspect of the tradition may be designed to keep children in their beds. In Rome, her house is said to be among the roofs of the Piazza Navona. (Note: È una figura non solo misteriosa, ma pericolosa se non si rispetta la sua invisibilità: chi incautamente volesse sorprenderla mentre deposita i doni incorrerebbe in gravi pericoli. A Roma, dove familiarmente hanno immaginato la sua casa fra i tetti di piazza Navona . . .) Grimm said she was a "terror to children". Siporin noted her contradictory character and summed it up thus: "She is grandmotherly but witchlike, the target of endless mockery but deeply beloved, ridiculous and dignified, domestic yet a wanderer, weak and dependent yet feared and powerful. She is an old woman played by a young man."

== Christian legend ==
Christian legend had it that the Befana was approached by the Biblical Magi, also known as the Three Wise Men or the Three Kings, a few days before the birth of the baby Jesus. They asked for directions to where the Son of God was, as they had seen his star in the sky, but she did not know. She provided them with shelter for a night as she was considered the best housekeeper in the village with the most pleasant home. The Magi invited her to join them on the journey to find the Baby Jesus, but she declined, stating she was too busy with her housework. Later, the Befana had a change of heart and tried to search out the Magi and Jesus. That night she was not able to find them, so to this day the Befana is still searching for the Baby Jesus. She leaves all the good children toys and candy (caramelle) or fruit while the bad children get coal or dark candy (carbone).

Another commonly heard Christian legend of the Befana starts at the time of the birth of the Baby Jesus. In this telling, Befana spent her days cleaning and sweeping. One day the Magi came to her door in search of the Baby Jesus. However, she turned them away because she was too busy cleaning. Feeling guilty, she eventually decides to find Jesus on her own by following a bright light, also known as the big star in the sky which she believes points the way. She brings along a bag filled with baked goods and gifts for Jesus and a broom to help the new mother clean. Unfortunately despite her best efforts she never finds him. According to this telling, the Befana is still searching after all these centuries for the newborn Messiah. On the eve of the Epiphany, the Befana comes to every house where there is a child and leaves a gift. Although she has been unsuccessful in her search, she still leaves gifts for children everywhere because the Christ Child can be found in all children.

== Associated figures ==
In folk tradition, various figures are related to her, comprising a family, and are present in the befanotti, though the exact characters involved vary in time and place. Always present is her husband and male counterpart, the Befano, though in some places Saint Anthony the Abbot is said to be her husband. Songs sung as part of the mumming by befanotti mention her children, who she is searching for food for either implicitly or explicitly, paralleled in real life by the befanotti doing the same. One song specifies their number at one hundred. Grimm noted that "some say, she is Herod’s daughter". In Latera, the Befana and Befano are accompanied by the Count of Buon’Umor, a crier-type character who announces their presence and asks people to host them and to treat them with love as they ask for it.

== Traditional customs ==
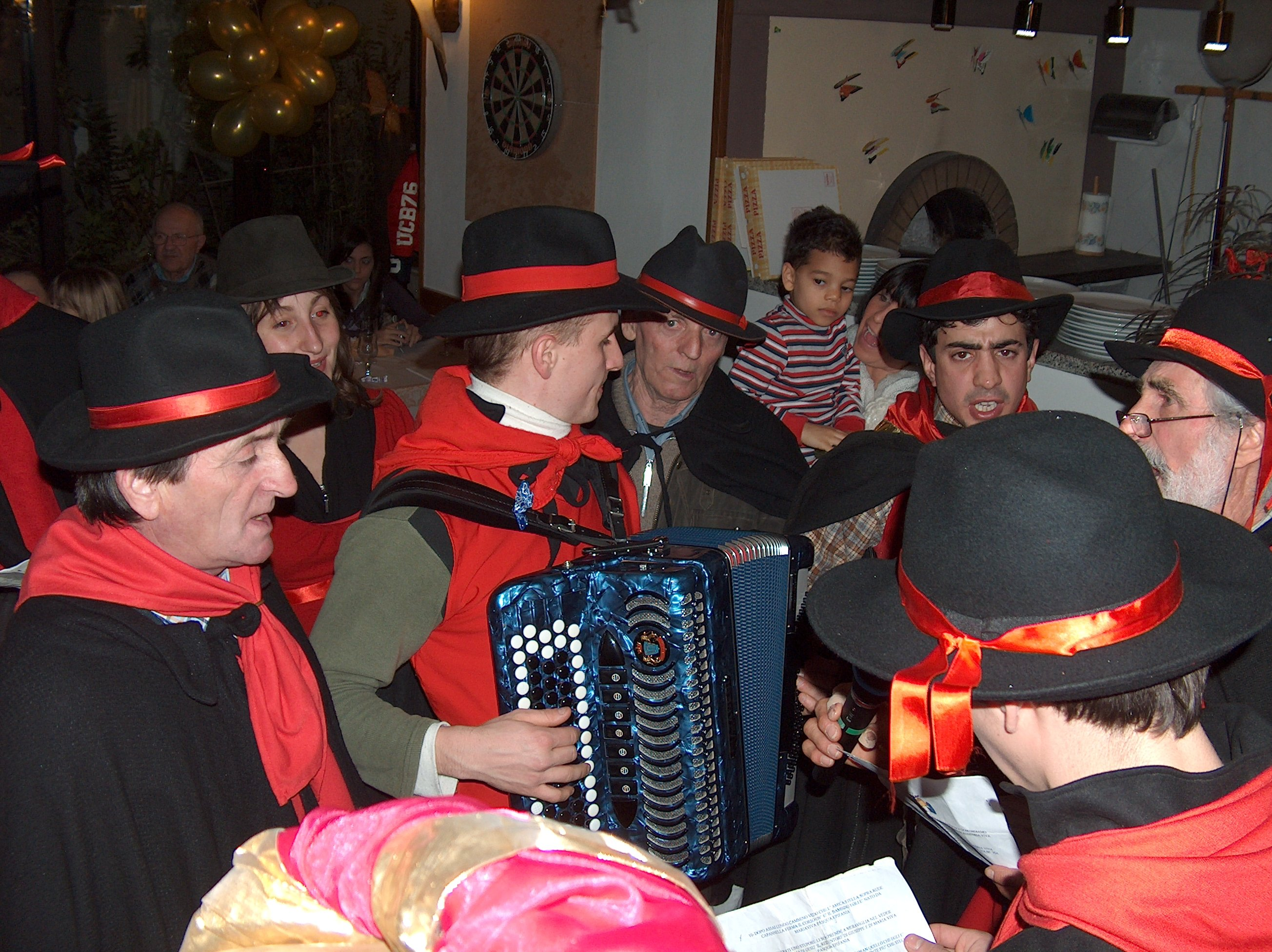
Befana feast in Santa Sofia

A number of customs are associated with her are practiced on the evening of January 5 and the following day, Epiphany (January 6). On the former, groups of men in the Italian countryside travel (Note: Itinerancy is a key feature of the custom.) from house to house collecting food, both for themselves and the Befana in exchange for performing a song, "The Befana" ("La Befana"), and sometimes skits and other entertainment like dancing and quips for the houses’ inhabitants. The men who participate in these activities are called befanotti. While scholars have traditionally called this a "begging custom", Steve Siporin disagrees and argues it is an equal exchange (food for entertainment) designed to preserve the dignity of the befanotti precisely so they are not reduced to begging. The befanotti themselves view it as an exchange and one song explicitly states "the Befana doesn’t beg". The songs often, implicitly or explicitly, encourage the people being visited to give generously, typically because if they do not something bad will happen, either to the household (including people, animals, and objects, such as the house itself) or to the Befana, who is effectively held hostage. Alternatively, these threats were not to be taken seriously, akin to teasing and pranks that are part of the fun and festivities of the Befanata rather than actual intimidation. Fitting this atmosphere, the skits performed by the befanotti are suggestive and carnivalesque and Epiphany is the start of the Carnival season. Sometimes the song requests specific foods from the households, of which meat, especially pork, and eggs are paramount. In Tuscany, the song is the main performance and is always present. Italian folklorists have collected a large number of Befana songs from all over the country which demonstrate great lyrical variety and are very local, though mention of local landmarks is rare. There may be versions of songs sung only to specific people, such as those who are stingy to convince them to be more generous. Traditionally, the men who comprised the befanotti were the poorest in the village and rich men were severely prohibited from forming their own squads and taking part. This is because the practical function of the befanotti was to provide those who had little to no food with fat and protein rich foods over the winter to, at least temporarily, ward off hunger and death via starvation, which was ever present in Italy until only the 20th century, in some areas even into the latter half of said century. Neither this restriction nor the sense that this custom is only for the poor exists nowadays. However the custom does not exist in all parts of the country. It is absent from Sicily where in the past wealthy landowners directly distributed food to the poor in a way that "was humiliating to the recipients", thus negating the need for the Befanata and other, similar begging or exchange rituals.

In the 20th century, Pitrè noted a custom in which "We carry around the old witch ... and we chase her". (Note: Noi meniamo in giro la vecchia strega . . . e la inseguiamo,) Dolls and effigies of the Befana are commonly made. The former are black and are considered lucky, possibly as a result of their black color. They are ugly in appearance and "made of rags". On Twelfth Night in Rome, these dolls are placed in windows by women and children and on Epiphany, "in some Tuscan villages a large effigy of her [the Befana] was burnt." Bonfires are often lit as well. On Epiphany eve, families with children typically leave out a small glass of wine and a plate with a few morsels of food, often regional or local, for the Befana.

== Ban ==
In 1977, the Italian government, headed at that time by Prime Minister Giulio Andreotti, canceled Epiphany as a national public holiday, along with several other feasts in the schedule, in an attempt to perk up the country’s sagging economy. Until recently, Epiphany had been "more lavishly celebrated than Christmas" and was also known by Italians as "Little Christmas". "Poor Befana, she is a refugee," Pope Paul VI lamented in a public speech, "She seeks shelter now on the first Sunday after the feast which was her own." The public holiday was reinstated in 1985.

== Parallels ==
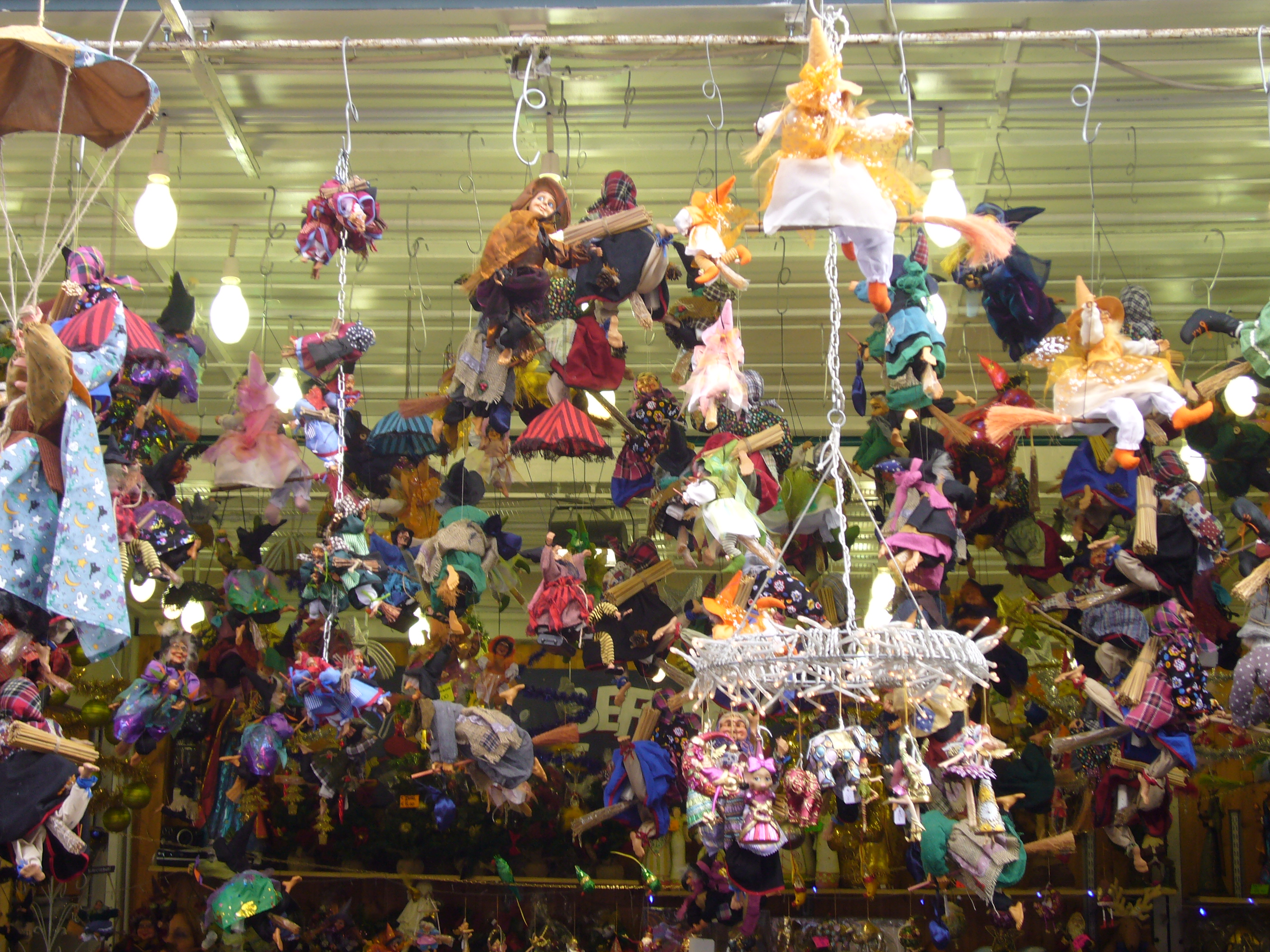
Befana feast in Piazza Navona, Rome

She has long been noted to resemble other Christmas gift-bringers and figures who roam during the Christmas season and is called the Italian version of them, though different parts of Italy have other gift-bringers as well, such as the Three Kings. In particular, her resemblance to the female German figures of Holle and Perchta is often noted by scholars, even if just in passing, and the Befana is considered their Italian equivalent. The Befana and Perchta "both bring well-being". There is an evil Befana who punishes girls and women who spin on Epiphany eve, which is prohibited in some places. Perchta does the same though the prohibited day(s) vary by location. There are also analogs in Greek, Anatolian, and Slavic mythology and traditions. Pitrè thought the modern Italian custom of carrying and driving the Befana out bears similarity to the ancient Roman custom of leading and driving out a figure called Mamurius Venturius, Old Winter Man, who was clad in animal skins. (Note: e i romani nella vigiliadegli Idi menavano per Roma cacciandolo per fuori le mura Mamurio Veturio, il vecchio inverno, sotto forma di un uomo coperto di pelli.) Historian Carlo Ginzburg relates her to Nicnevin. The old lady character should then represent the "old year" just passed, ready to be burned in order to give place to the new one. In many European countries, the tradition still exists of burning a puppet of an old lady at the beginning of the New Year. In northern Italy, this figure is called Giubiana.

== Interpretations and theories ==
The mystery of the Befana has led to many interpretations and theories over the centuries. The tradition of Befana appears to incorporate several pre-Christian popular elements, adapted to Christian culture and related to the celebration of the New Year. Jacob Grimm simply called her a "misshapen fairy" despite drawing parallels between her and Perchta, the latter of whom he considered to be a former heathen goddess. James Frazer simply said she was "an old hag." Steve Siporin thinks "they both missed the mark." After noting that effigies of her are burnt, Marinoni remarks "Of how many things does indeed the dawn of a new year mark the death!" John Forsdyke says she has "become the representative of the evil influences that are destroyed on Twelfth Night." Cattabiani reports that she has been interpreted as "an image of Mother Nature" and the old dying year who sows the seeds, even if just symbolically, for her reappearance "in the guise of young Nature", alluding to a goddess with power over plants, animals, abundance, prosperity, life, and death. (Note: È stata interpretata come un’immagine di Madre Natura che, giunta alla fine dell’anno invecchiata e rinsecchita, assume le sembianze di una befana e prima di morire offre dolciumi e regalini che altro non sono, simbolicamente, se non i semi, grazie ai quali riapparirà nelle vesti di giovinetta Natura. Questa Madre Natura non è solo un fenomeno peculiare italiano, ma rivela analogie con la mitologia greco-anatolica e con molte tradizioni germaniche e slave. Allude alla Grande Madre, signora della vita, che regna su animali, rocce, vegetali, evocando l’idea della fecondità, dell’abbondanza, della prosperità: madre del cosmo che governa il ciclo terreno di vita-morte-vita . . .) Italian anthropologists Claudia and Luigi Manciocco, in their book Una casa senza porte ("A House without Doors"), trace the Befana's origins back to Neolithic beliefs and practices. The team of anthropologists also wrote about the Befana as a figure that evolved into a goddess associated with fertility and agriculture. The Befana may be connected to a prehistoric European bear cult that was practiced among hunter-gatherers and which dates as far back as the Upper Paleolithic.

A theory connects the tradition of exchanging gifts to an ancient Roman festivity in honor of Janus and Strenia (in Italian a Christmas gift used to be called strenna), celebrated at the beginning of the year when Romans used to give each other presents. In the book Vestiges of Ancient Manners and Customs, Discoverable in Modern Italy and Sicily (1823), John J. Blunt says:

This Befana appears to be heir at law of a certain heathen goddess called Strenia, who presided over the new-year's gifts, 'Strenae', from which, indeed, she derived her name. Her presents were of the same description as those of the Befana—figs, dates, and honey. Moreover her solemnities were vigorously opposed by the early Christians on account of their noisy, riotous, and licentious character".

== Contemporary customs ==
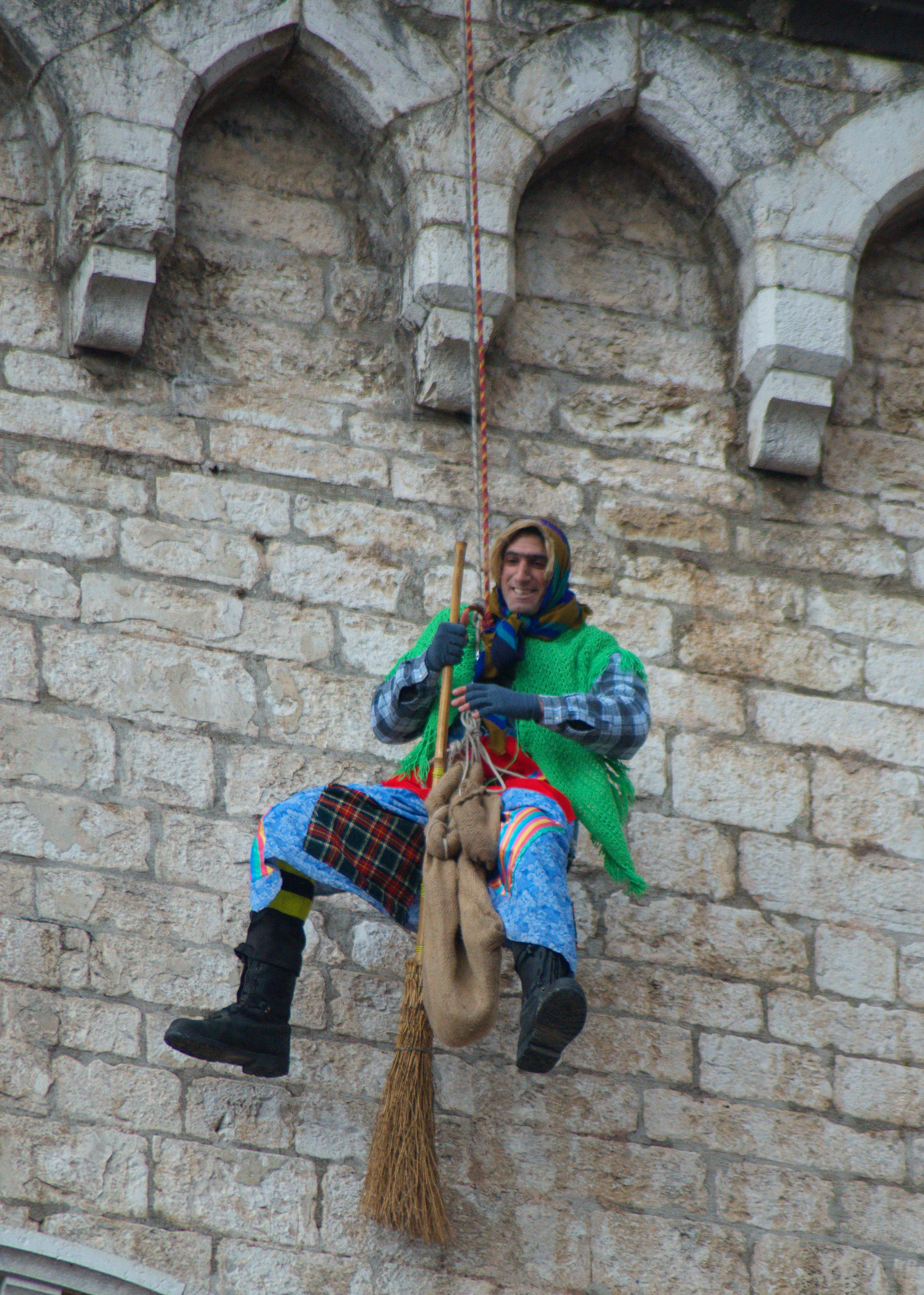
Befana feast in Gubbio

The Befana is celebrated throughout all of Italy, and has become a national icon. In the regions of Marche, Umbria, and Lazio, her figure is associated with the Papal States where the Epiphany held the most importance. Urbania is thought to be her official home. Every year there is a big festival held to celebrate the holiday. About 30,000 to 50,000 people attend the festivities. Hundreds of Befanas are present, swinging from the main tower. They juggle, dance, and greet all the children.

Traditionally, all Italian children may expect to find a lump of "coal" in their stockings (actually rock candy made black with food coloring) as every child has been at least occasionally bad during the year.

Three places in Italy are nowadays associated with the Befana tradition:

- Piazza Navona, in central Rome, is the site of a popular market each year between Christmas and the Epiphany, where toys, coal candy, and other candies are on sale. The feast of the Befana in Rome was immortalized in four famous sonnets in the Romanesco dialect by the 19th century Roman poet Giuseppe Gioachino Belli. In Ottorino Respighi's 1928 Feste Romane (English: "Roman Festivals"), the fourth movement, titled La Befana, is an orchestral portrayal of this Piazza Navona festival. A common superstition is that at midnight when it turns January 6 the Befana shows herself in a window of Piazza Navona and visitors often go there to observe this.
- The town of Urbania in the province of Pesaro and Urbino in Marche where the national Befana festival is held each year, usually between January 2 and 6. A "house of the Befana" is scheduled to be built and the post office has a mailbox reserved for letters addressed to the Befana, mirroring what happens with Santa Claus in Rovaniemi.
- In Fornovo di Taro, a town in the province of Parma, the national meeting "Raduno Nazionale delle Befane e dei Befani" is held on 5 and 6 January.

In other parts of the world where a vibrant Italian community exists, traditions involving Befana may be observed and shared or celebrated with the wider community. In Toronto, Canada for example, a Befana Choir shows up on the winter solstice each December to sing in the Kensington Market Festival of Lights parade. Women, men, and children dressed in Befana costumes and nose sing love songs to serenade the sun to beckon its return. The singing hags gather in the street to give candy to children, to cackle and screech to accordion music, and to sing in every key imaginable as delighted parade participants join in the cacophony. Sometimes, the Befanas dance with paradegoers and dust down the willing as they walk by.

== Poems and songs ==
There are poems about Befana, which are known in slightly different versions throughout Italy. Here is one of the versions:

La Befana vien di notte
Con le scarpe tutte rotte
Col vestito alla romana
Viva, Viva La Befana!

The English translation is:

The Befana comes by night
With her shoes all tattered and torn
She comes dressed in the Roman way
Long live the Befana!

Another version is given in a poem by Giovanni Pascoli:

Viene, viene la Befana
Vien dai monti a notte fonda
Come è stanca! la circonda
Neve e gelo e tramontana!
Viene, viene la Befana

The English translation is:

Here comes, here comes the Befana
She comes from the mountains in the deep of the night
Look how tired she is! All wrapped up
In snow and frost and the north wind!
Here comes, here comes the Befana!

== In modern media ==
- How the Toys Saved Christmas, 1996 animated film.
- Miraculous: Tales of Ladybug & Cat Noir features a villainous version of the character in the season 2 episode "Befana".
- The Italian-language Christmas fantasy comedy film The Legend of the Christmas Witch (Italian: La Befana vien di notte) was released on December 27, 2018. The Italian-Spanish co-production was directed by Michele Soavi and features a 500-year-old Befana who works as a schoolteacher by day.
- The 2022 Disney+ Christmas miniseries The Santa Clauses featured Befana played by Laura San Giacomo.
- In season 2 episode 7 of the 2025 Netflix series The Four Seasons, it is a running joke that Anne, played by Kerri Kenney-Silver, bears a resemblance to Befana.

== See also ==
- Krampus
- Père Fouettard
- Zwarte Piet

== Bibliography ==
- Biondi, Angelo (1981). "La Befana nel soranese e nel pitiglianese". In Roberto Ferretti (ed.). La tradizione della Befana nella Maremma di Grosseto. Grosseto: Comune di Grosseto, Archivio delle tradizioni popolari della Maremma grossetana. pp. 65–102. (in Italian)
- Cacopardo, Augusto S. (2016). Pagan Christmas: Winter Feasts of the Kalasha of the Hindu Kush. Gingko.
- Cattabiani, Alfredo (2008) [1988]. Calendario. Le feste, i miti, le leggende e i riti dell'anno. Milan, Italy: Mondadori. ISBN 88-04-58419-X; ISBN 978-88-04-58419-3 . (in Italian)
- "Epiphany is Not a Fable, Pope Says". Catholic News Service – Newsfeeds. 1978-01-09. Retrieved 2024-03-04.
- Forsdyke, John (1954). "The 'Harvester Vase' of Hagia Triada". Journal of the Warburg and Courtauld Institutes. 17 (1/2): 1-9.
- Frank, Roslyn M. (May 2004). "Hunting the European Sky Bears: German 'Straw-bears' and their Relatives as Transformers"/"Die Jagd auf die europäischen Himmelsbären Deutsche 'Strohbären' und ihre Verwandten als Verwandler". In Michael and Barbara Rappenglück (eds.). Symbole der Wandlung - Wandel der Symbole. Proceedingsof the Gesellschaft für wissenschaftliche Symbolforschung/Society for the Scientific Study of Symbols. Germany. pp. 141–166.
- Grimm, Jacob (2004a) [1883]. Teutonic Mythology: Volume I. Translated by James Steven Stallybrass. Mineola: Dover.
- Marinoni, A. (January 1916). "Popular Feasts and Legends in Italy". The Sewanee Review. 24 (1): 69-80.
- Muthig, John (1978-01-06). "Italians Adjust to Loss of 'Little Christmas'". Catholic News Service – Newsfeeds. Retrieved 2024-03-04.
- Pitrè, Giuseppe, cited in Giuseppe Cocchiara (2016) [1952]. In Bollati Boringhieri (ed.). Storia del folklore in Europa. Turin, Italy: Gruppo editoriale Mauri Spagnol. ISBN 978-88-339-7450-7. (in Italian)
- Siporin, Steve (2022). The Befana Is Returning: The Story of a Tuscan Festival. Madison, United States of America: University of Wisconsin Press. ISBN 978-0-29933-730-8.
- Siporin, Steve (2023). "Excerpt from Wayland D. Hand Prize Winner The Befana Is Returning: The Story of a Tuscan Festival". TFH: The Journal of History and Folklore. 39 & 40: 88–119.
- Smith, John B. (August 2004). "Perchta the Belly-Slitter and Her Kin: A View of Some Traditional Threatening Figures, Threats and Punishments". Folklore. 115 (2): 167–186.
- Young, Sheila M. (2017). "The Evolution of the Contemporary Blackening". Folklore. 128 (3): 244-270. doi:10.1080/0015587X.2017.1327633.
