= Caca (mythology) =

Roman mythical character

In ancient Roman religion and myth, Caca or Cacia is the giantess sister of Cacus, the son of Vulcan who stole cattle from Hercules during the course of his western labors. Caca betrays her brother by revealing the location of the cattle to Hercules, who had in turn stolen the cattle from Geryon.

According to Lactantius and Servius, she was cultivated as a deity in recognition of her service to the god.

In his conceptual approach to Roman deity, Michael Lipka gives Cacus/Caca as one of the examples of divine pairs differentiated by gender but bound by kinship, as Libera was the sister of Liber and Fauna the daughter, sister, or wife of Faunus. Lipka suggests that these deities did not come into existence as pairs, but developed to provide complementary gender balance within their sphere of influence, in this case cattle-raising.

Despite the lateness of the only ancient sources that mention her, Caca is probably an older Roman goddess. Servius says she had a sacellum (shrine), probably located in Rome, where sacrifices were made to her through the agency of the Vestals. She has thus been seen as a sort of "proto-Vesta", a fire goddess sharing in her brother's Vulcan-inherited capacity for fire-breathing.
