= Strenna =

Strenna or Strenna di Natale is a gift that is usual to make or receive in Italy at Christmas time.

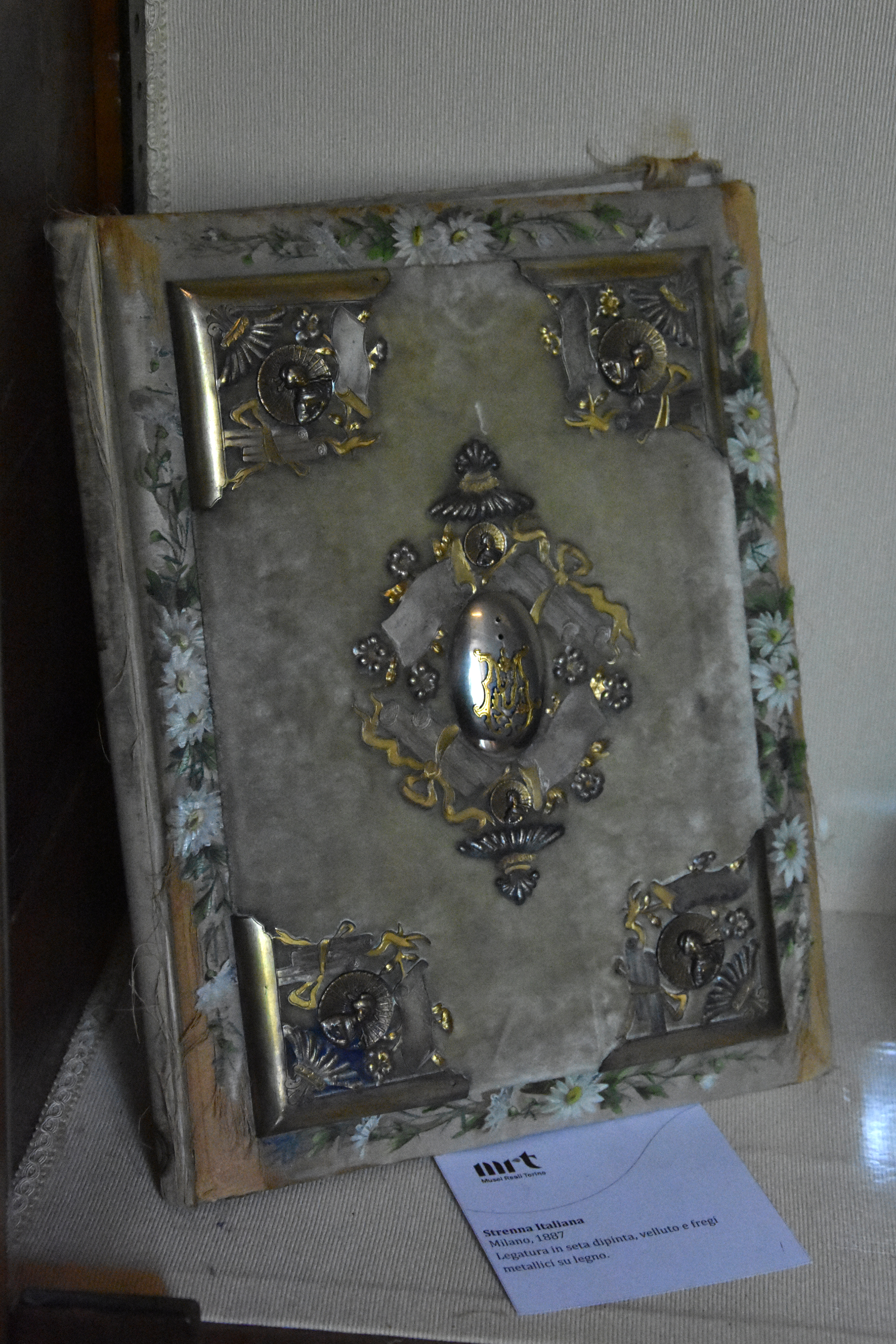
Strenna italiana prodotta a Milano nel 1887 e conservata nella Biblioteca Reale di Torino

This custom comes from the tradition of ancient Rome which involved the exchange of gifts of good wishes during the Saturnalia, a series of festivities that took place each year between 17 and 23 December, in honor of the god Saturn and preceding the day of the Natalis Solis Invicti. The term derives from the Latin Strena, word probably of Sabine origin, with the meaning "gift of good luck."

According to Varro, the use was adopted as early as the first foundation of the city, set up by Titus Tatius who first caught, as good augur for the new year, the twig of a plant (arbor felix) located in the woods sacred to the goddess Strenia; from this derived the term strenae for the gifts of various kinds, including coins, to be exchanged in the feast of Saturnalia.

In the publishing field, in the nineteenth century, strenna was also a collection of poems in prose and poetry that was placed for sale in the New Year. This use nowadays has diminished, but not ceased. From this custom come the definitions "strenne editoriali" or "libro strenna" (English: gift book) for publications placed on the market during the first week of December, having as main purpose to serve as a traditional gift for the Christmas festivities.

== Sources ==
- Angelo De Gubernatis, Storia comparata degli usi natalizi in Italia e presso gli altri popoli indo-europei, Milan, Treves, 1919
- Alfredo Cattabiani, Calendario, le feste, i miti, le leggende e i riti dell'anno, Rusconi, 1988
- Alfredo Cattabiani, Simboli, miti e misteri di Roma, Newton Compton, 1990
