= Mezentius =

Figure in Roman mythology

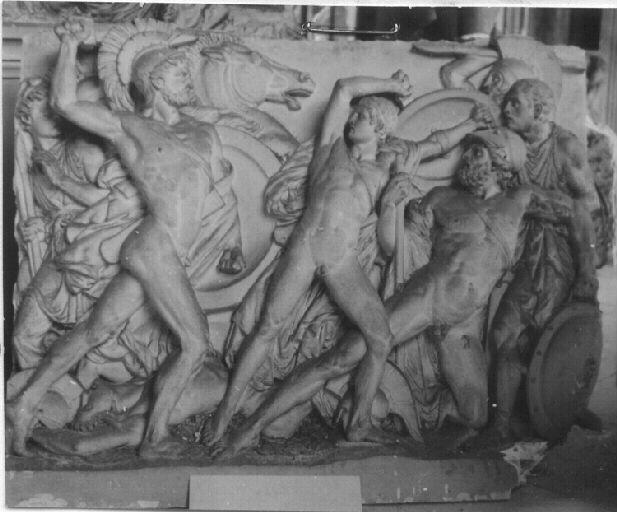
Mezentius wounded, preserved by his intrepid son Lausus, first prize of the Prix de Rome by Louis-Léon Cugnot, 1859

In Roman mythology, Mezentius was an Etruscan king, and father of Lausus. Sent into exile because of his cruelty, he moved to Latium. He reveled in bloodshed and was overwhelmingly savage on the battlefield, but more significantly to a Roman audience he was a contemptor divum, a "despiser of the gods."

He appears in Virgil's Aeneid, primarily book ten, where he aids Turnus in a war against Aeneas and the Trojans. While in battle with Aeneas, he is critically injured by a spear blow, but his son Lausus bravely blocks Aeneas's final blow. Lausus is then killed by Aeneas, and Mezentius is able to escape death for a short while. Once he hears of Lausus' death, he feels ashamed that his son died in his place and returns to battle on his horse Rhaebus in order to avenge him. He is able to keep Aeneas on the defensive for some time by riding around Aeneas and throwing javelins. Eventually, Aeneas kills the horse with a spear and pins Mezentius underneath. He is overcome by Aeneas, but remains defiant and refuses to ask for mercy, as Turnus later does; he only asks that he be buried with his son.

In the traditional myth that predates the Aeneid, Mezentius actually outlived Aeneas, who 'disappeared' into the river which Aeneas became associated with in a hero cult. However, since his benefactor Maecenas was a native Etruscan, Virgil portrayed Mezentius as a tyrant, attributing to him personally the evils of which the Greek authors had previously accused the Etruscans, such as torture and savagery, an ethnic prejudice already present in the Homeric Hymns. Thus he created something of a scapegoat of Mezentius and portrayed the Etruscan people as a good race who fight alongside Aeneas.
