= Sideways I =

Epigraphic letter of the Latin alphabet

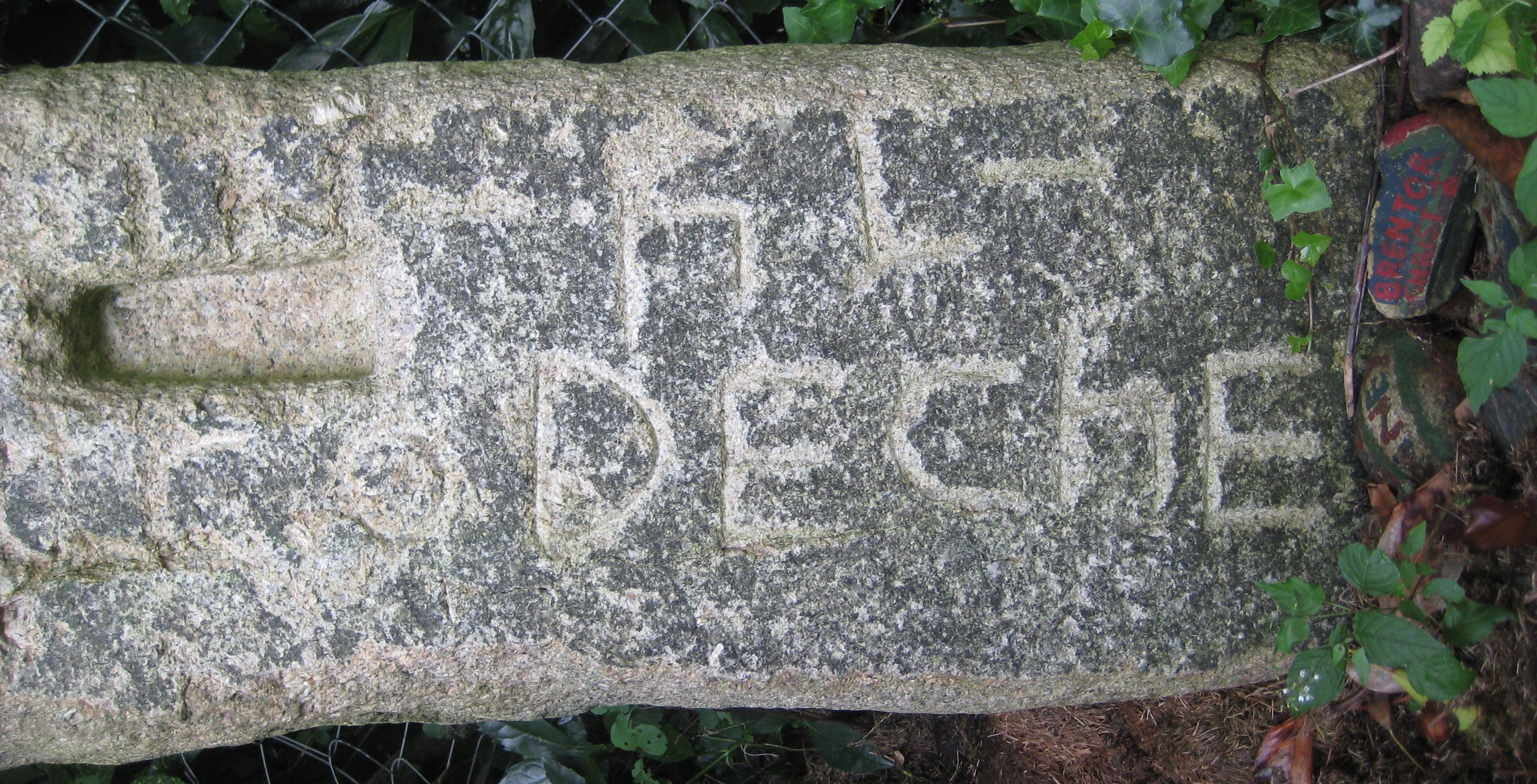
Detail of a memorial stone in Tavistock, Devon, inscribed SABINꟷ FILꟷ MACCODECHETꟷ ("Of Sabinus, son of Maccodechetus"), showing sideways I in the words Sabini and fili.

The Sideways I ꟷ is an epigraphic variant of Latin capital letter I used in early medieval Celtic inscriptions from Wales and southwest England (Cornwall and Devon). About 36 monumental inscriptions in Wales, and about 15 in Cornwall and Devon, mostly dating from the 5th-6th centuries, make use of this letter. Except for a single inscription from the Isle of Man, it is not found in monumental inscriptions elsewhere. The letter is used exclusively in a word-final position for Latin words (or Latinized Celtic names) in the second declension genitive singular.

== Encoding ==
The character was proposed for encoding in the Unicode standard in 2011. It has since been encoded at code point U+A7F7 ꟷ LATIN EPIGRAPHIC LETTER SIDEWAYS I in Unicode 7.0.
