= Evander of Pallantium =

Culture hero of Greek and Roman myth

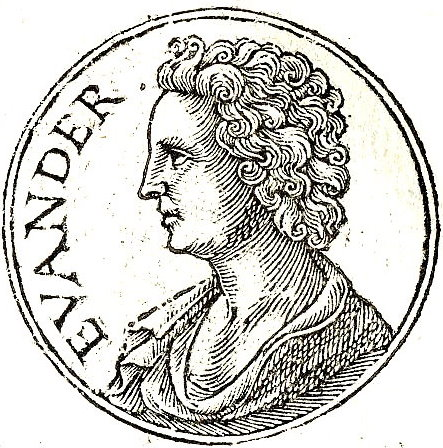
Evander from Promptuarii Iconum Insigniorum

In Roman mythology, Evander (from Greek Εὔανδρος meaning "good man" or "strong man": an etymology used by poets to emphasize the hero's virtue) was a culture hero from Arcadia, Greece, who was said to have brought the pantheon, laws, and alphabet of Greece to ancient Italy, where he founded the city of Pallantium on the future site of Palatine Hill, Rome, sixty years before the Trojan War. He instituted the festival of the Lupercalia. Evander was deified after his death and an altar was constructed to him on the Aventine Hill.

In addition, Strabo mentions a story that Rome was an Arcadian colony founded by Evander.

== Genealogy ==
Dionysius of Halicarnassus writes that Evander was the son of Hermes and a local nymph of the Arcadians, called Themis. He also mentions that the writers of the early history of Rome called her, in their native language, Carmenta. Strabo writes that the Romans honour the mother of Evander, regarding her as one of the nymphs, and have renamed her Carmenta (a derivation of the Latin word for song). Evander's wisdom was beyond that of all Arcadians. His son Pallas apparently died childless; however, the gens Fabia claimed descent from Evander through his grandson Fabius, son of Hercules by a daughter of Evander.

Dionysius of Halicarnassus also mentions that some writers, including Polybius of Megalopolis say that Lavinia was the daughter of Evander and had a son with Heracles who was named Pallas.

== In the Aeneid ==
Evander plays a major role in Virgil's Aeneid Books VIII-XII. Previous to the Trojan War, Evander gathered a group of native Latins to a city he founded in Italy near the Tiber river, which he named Pallantium. Virgil states that he named the city in honour of his Arcadian ancestor, Pallas, although Pausanias, Livy and Dionysius of Halicarnassus say that originally Evander's birth city was Pallantium in Arcadia, after which he named the new city. The reasons for Evander's fleeing his homeland are unclear; Ovid states that Evander had angered the gods and had been sent into exile by way of a trial; Dionysius describes a civil unrest in Arcadia which led to Evander and his people being forced to leave; the commentator Servius, however, recounts that Evander's mother persuaded him to murder his father, Hermes, leading to the pair being banished from Arcadia, although other commentators have it that Evander killed his mother. Evander settled in Pallantium where it is said he killed the three-souled Erulus, the king of Italy, three times in one day, prior to becoming the most powerful King of Italy.

The oldest tradition of its founding ascribes to Evander the erection of the Great Altar of Hercules in the Forum Boarium. In Aeneid, VIII, where Aeneas and his crew first come upon Evander and his people, they were venerating Hercules for dispatching the giant Cacus. Virgil's listeners would have related this scene to the same Great Altar of Hercules in the Forum Boarium of their own day, one detail among many in the Aeneid that Virgil used to link the heroic past of myth with the Age of Augustus. Also according to Virgil, Hercules was returning from Gades with Geryon's cattle when Evander entertained him. Evander then became the first to raise an altar to Hercules' heroism. This archaic altar was destroyed in the Great Fire of Rome, AD 64.

Because of their traditional ties, Evander aids Aeneas in his war against Turnus and the Rutuli: the Arcadian had known the father of Aeneas, Anchises, before the Trojan War, and shares a common ancestry through Atlas with Aeneas's family. In the Aeneid, it is said that Evander took possession of the country Italy by force, murdering king Herilus, the king of Praeneste.
