= Pallantium =

City in the Aeneid

Pallantium (Ancient Greek: Παλλάντιον) was an ancient city near the Tiber river on the Italian peninsula. Roman mythology, as recounted in Virgil's Aeneid for example, states that the city was founded in Magna Graecia by Evander of Pallene and other ancient Greeks sometime previous to the Trojan War. In addition, Dionysius of Halicarnassus writes that Romans say that the city was founded by Greeks from Pallantium of Arcadia, about sixty years before the Trojan war and the leader was Evander. Solinus writes that the Arcadians were the founders of the city.

The myth of the city's origin was significant in ancient Roman mythology because Pallantium became one of the cities that was merged later into ancient Rome, thereby tying Rome's origins to the ancient Greek heroes. Other cities in the area were founded by various Italic tribes.

Virgil states that Evander named the city in honor of his ancestor, Pallas, although Pausanias as well as Dionysius of Halicarnassus say that Evander's birth city was Pallantium of Arcadia, and thus he named the new city after it. Dionysius of Halicarnassus also mentions that some writers, including Polybius of Megalopolis, say that the town was named after Pallas, who was the son of Heracles and Lavinia, the daughter of Evander, and when he died his grandfather raised a tomb to him on the hill and called the place Pallantium, after him.

The origin of Rome and the composition of its people are worthy of remark. They explain the particular character of its policy, and the exceptional part that fell to it from the beginning in the midst of other cities. The Roman race was strangely mixed. The principal element was Latin, and originally from Alba; but these Albans themselves, according to traditions which no criticism authorizes us to reject, were composed of two associated, but not confounded, populations. One was the aboriginal race, real Latins. The other was of foreign origin, and was said to have come from Troy with Aeneas, the priest-founder; it was, to all appearance, not numerous, but was influential from the worship and the institutions which it had brought with it.

These Albans, a mixture of two races, founded Rome on a spot where another city had already been built — Pallantium, founded by the Greeks. Now, the population of Pallantium remained in the new city, and the rites of the Greek worship were preserved there. There was also, where the Capitol afterwards stood, a city which was said to have been founded by Hercules, the families of which remained distinct from the rest of the Roman population during the entire continuance of the republic.

Thus at Rome all races were associated and mingled; there were Latins, Trojans, and Greeks; there were, a little later, Sabines, and Etruscans. Of the several hills, the Palatine was the Latin city, after having been the city of Evander. The Capitoline, after having been the dwelling-place of the companions of Hercules, became the home of the Sabines of Tatius. The Quirinal received its name from the Sabine Quirites, or from the Sabine god Quirinus. The Coelian hill appears to have been inhabited from the beginning by Etruscans. Rome did not seem to be a single city; it appeared like a confederation of several cities, each one of which was attached by its origin to another confederation. It was the centre where the Latins, Etruscans, Sabellians, and Greeks met.

--Numa Denis Fustel de Coulanges, The Ancient City, 311
