= Saturn (mythology) =

God in ancient Roman mythology

- god of the Capitol, time, wealth, agriculture, and liberation
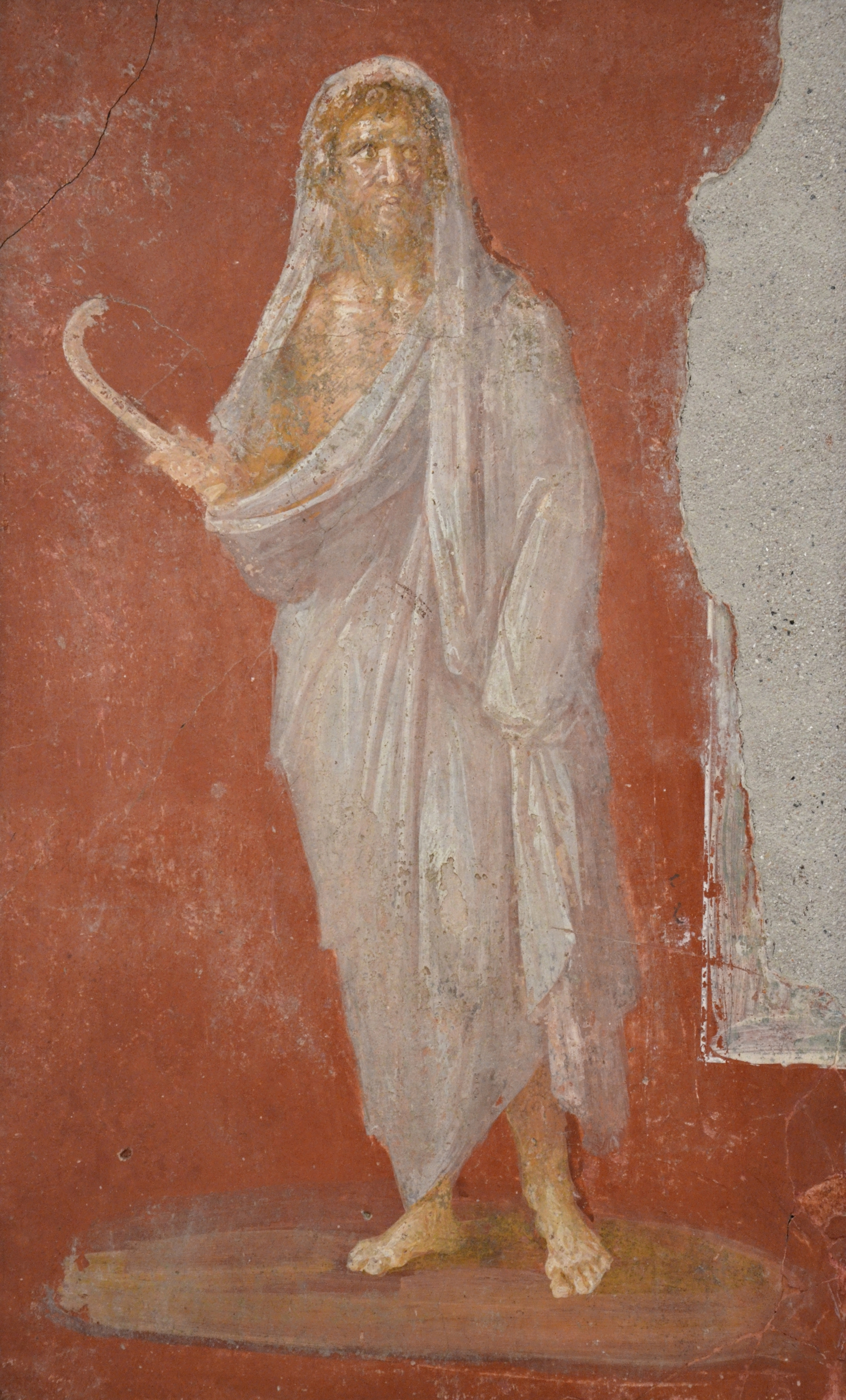
- Saturn wearing his toga "capite velato" and holding a sickle (fresco from the House of the Dioscuri at Pompeii, Naples Archaeological Museum)
- Major cult center: Temple of Saturn
- Abode: Capitoline Hill
- Planet: Saturn
- Symbol: Sickle, scythe, veil
- Day: Saturday
- Gender: Male
- Festivals: Saturnalia

Genealogy
- Parents: Caelus and Terra
- Siblings: Janus, Ops
- Consort: Ops
- Children: Jupiter, Neptune, Pluto, Juno, Ceres, and Vesta

Equivalents
- Etruscan: Satre
- Greek: Cronus

Saturn (Latin: Sāturnus [saːˈtʊrnʊs]) was a god in ancient Roman religion, and a character in Roman mythology. He was described as a god of time, generation, dissolution, abundance, wealth, agriculture, periodic renewal and liberation. Saturn's mythological reign was depicted as a Golden Age of abundance and peace. After the Roman conquest of Greece, he was conflated with the Greek Titan Cronus. Saturn's consort was his sister Ops, with whom he fathered Jupiter, Neptune, Pluto, Juno, Ceres and Vesta.

Saturn was especially celebrated during the festival of Saturnalia each December, perhaps the most famous of the Roman festivals, a time of feasting, role reversals, free speech, gift-giving and revelry. The Temple of Saturn in the Roman Forum housed the state treasury and archives (aerarium) of the Roman Republic and the early Roman Empire. The planet Saturn and the day of the week Saturday are both named after and were associated with him.

== Mythology ==
The Roman land preserved the remembrance of a very remote time during which Saturn and Janus reigned on the site of the city before its foundation: the Capitol was called mons Saturnius. (Note: B. Liou Gilles "Naissance de la ligue latine. Mythe et culte de fondation" in Revue belge de philologie et d'histoire 74 1. pp. 73–97: 75. doi:10.3406/rbph.1996.4096. citing Festus (Note: Saturnia Italia, et mons, qui nunc est Capitolinus, Saturnius appellabatur, quod in tutela Saturni esse existimantur. Saturnii quoque dicebantur, qui castrum in imo clivo Capitolino incolebant, ubi ara diacata ei deo ante bellum troianum videtur.) and Ovid (Note: A patre dicta meo quondam Saturnia Roma est.)) The Romans identified Saturn with the Greek Cronus, whose myths were adapted for Latin literature and Roman art. In particular, Cronus's role in the genealogy of the Greek gods was transferred to Saturn. As early as Andronicus (3rd century BC), Jupiter was called the son of Saturn.

Saturn had two mistresses who represented different aspects of the god. The name of his wife, Ops, the Roman equivalent of Greek Rhea, means "wealth, abundance, resources." The association with Ops is considered a later development, however, as this goddess was originally paired with Consus. Earlier was Saturn's association with Lua ("destruction, dissolution, loosening"), a goddess who received the bloodied weapons of enemies destroyed in war.

Under Saturn's rule, humans enjoyed the spontaneous bounty of the earth without labor in the "Golden Age" described by Hesiod and Ovid. He became known as the god of time.

== Etymology and epithets ==
By Saturn they seek to represent that power which maintains the cyclic course of times and seasons. This is the sense that the Greek name of that god bears, for he is called Cronus, which is the same as Chronos or Time. Saturn for his part got his name because he was "sated" with years; the story that he regularly devoured his own children is explained by the fact that time devours the courses of the seasons, and gorges itself "insatiably" on the years that are past. Saturn was enchained by Jupiter to ensure that his circuits did not get out of control, and to constrain him with the bonds of the stars.

— Quintus Lucilius Balbus,
as quoted by Cicero

According to Varro, Saturn's name was derived from satus, meaning "sowing". Even though this etymology is problematic from the viewpoint of modern linguistics (for, while historically-motivated vowel length alternations do occur in Latin roots, the long ā in Sāturnus in particular remains unexplained with this etymology, and also because of the epigraphically attested form Saeturnus), nevertheless it does reflect an original feature of the god. Perhaps a more probable etymology connects the name with the Etruscan god Satre and placenames such as Satria, an ancient town of Latium, and Saturae palus, a marsh also in Latium. This root may be related to Latin phytonym satureia. (Like satus, however, satureia, Saturae palus, and probably also Satria, as indeed the apparently closely related Satricum, all also have a short a in the first syllable vs. the long ā of Sāturnus.)

Another epithet, variably Sterculius, Stercutus, and Sterces, referred to his agricultural functions; this derives from stercus, "dung" or "manure", referring to re‑emergence from death to life. Farming was important to Roman identity, and Saturn was a part of archaic Roman religion and ethnic identity. His name appears in the ancient hymn of the Salian priests, and his temple was the oldest known in the records of the pontiffs.

Quintus Lucilius Balbus gives a separate etymology in Cicero's De Natura Deorum. In this interpretation, the agricultural aspect of Saturn would be secondary to his primary relation with time and seasons. Since 'Time consumes all things', Balbus asserts that the name Saturn comes from the Latin word satis; Saturn being an anthropomorphic representation of Time, which is filled, or satiated, by all things or all generations. Since farming is so closely linked to seasons and therefore an understanding of the cyclical passage of time, it follows that agriculture would then be associated with the deity Saturn.

== Temple ==
The temple of Saturn was located at the base of the Capitoline Hill, according to a tradition recorded by Varro formerly known as Saturnius Mons, and a row of columns from the last rebuilding of the temple still stands. The temple was consecrated in 497 BC but the area Saturni was built by king Tullus Hostilius as confirmed by archaeological studies conducted by E. Gjerstad. (Note: In Mélanges A. Grenier Bruxelles (1962) pp. 757-762 as cited by Briquel) It housed the state treasury (aerarium) throughout Roman history.

== Festival's time ==
The position of Saturn's festival in the Roman calendar led to his association with concepts of time, especially the temporal transition of the New Year. In the Greek tradition, Kronos was sometimes conflated with Chronos, "Time," and his devouring of his children taken as an allegory for the passing of generations. As such, the Roman Saturn had similar associations. The sickle or scythe of Father Time is a remnant of the agricultural implement of Cronus-Saturn, and his aged appearance represents the waning of the old year with the birth of the new, in antiquity sometimes embodied by Aion. In late antiquity, Saturn is syncretized with a number of deities, and begins to be depicted as winged, as is Kairos, "Timing, Right Time".

== In Roman religion ==
=== Theology and worship ===
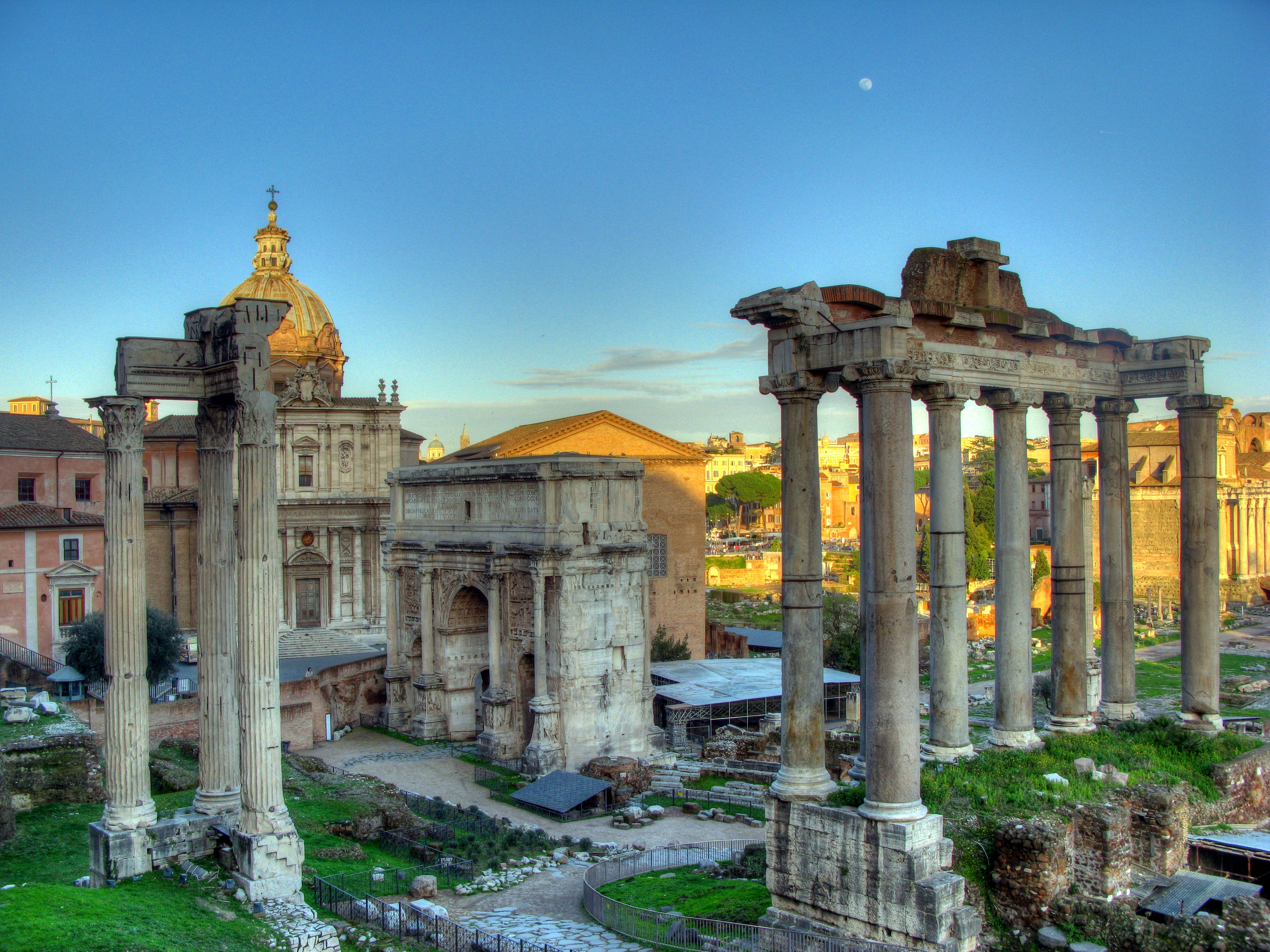
Ruins of the Temple of Saturn (eight columns to the far right) in February 2010, with three columns from the Temple of Vespasian and Titus (left) and the Arch of Septimius Severus (center)

The figure of Saturn is one of the most complex in Roman religion. Dumézil refrained from discussing Saturn in his work on Roman religion on the grounds of insufficient knowledge. Conversely, however, his follower Dominique Briquel has attempted a thorough interpretation of Saturn utilising Dumézil's three-functional theory of Indo-European religion, taking the ancient testimonies and the works of A. Brelich and G. Piccaluga as his basis.

The main difficulty scholars encounter in studying Saturn lies in determining how much is original to his (Roman) character and how much the product of later hellenising influences. Moreover, some features of the god may be common to Cronus but are nonetheless very ancient and can be considered proper to the Roman god, whereas others are certainly later and arrived after 217 BCE, the year in which the Greek customs of the Kronia were introduced into the Saturnalia.

==== Briquel's analysis ====
Among the features which are definitely authentic of the Roman god, Briquel identifies:

1. the time of his festival in the calendar, which corresponds to the date of the consecration of his temple (the Greek Cronia on the other hand took place in June–July);
2. his association with Lua Mater, and
3. the location of his cult on the Capitol, which goes back to remote times. (Note: cited by Briquel)

These three elements in Briquel's view indicate that Saturn is a sovereign god. The god's strict relationship with the cults of the Capitoline Hill and in particular with Jupiter are highlighted by the legends concerning the refusal of gods Iuventas and Terminus to leave their abode in the shrines on the Capitol when the temple of Jupiter was to be built. These two deities correspond to the helper gods of the sovereign in Vedic religion (Briquel refers to Dhritarashtra and Vidura, the figures of the Mahabharata) and to the Cyclopes and Hecatoncheires in Hesiod. Whereas the helper gods belong to the second divine generation they become active only at the level of the third in each of the three instances of India, Greece and Rome, where they become a sort of continuation of Jupiter. (Note: Iuventas shows a clear Varunian character in the liaison of Romulus with the iuvenes the young soldiers; Terminus has a Mitran character even though he shows Varunian traits in allowing the enlargement of the borders (propagatio finium): Briquel))

Dumézil postulated a split of the figure of the sovereign god in Indoeuropean religion, which is embodied by Vedic gods Varuna and Mitra. Of the two, the first one shows the aspect of the magic, uncanny, awe inspiring power of creation and destruction, while the second shows the reassuring aspect of guarantor of the legal order in organised social life. Whereas in Jupiter these double features have coalesced, Briquel sees Saturn as showing the characters of a sovereign god of the Varunian type. His nature becomes evident in his mastership over the annual time of crisis around the winter solstice, epitomised in the power of subverting normal codified social order and its rules, which is apparent in the festival of the Saturnalia, in the mastership of annual fertility and renewal, in the power of annihilation present in his consort (= divine associate/companion deity) Lua, in the fact that he is the god of a timeless era of abundance and bounty before time, which he reinstates at the time of the yearly crisis of the winter solstice.

In Roman and Etruscan reckoning Saturn is a wielder of lightning; no other agricultural god (in the sense of specialized human activity) is one. (Note: Pliny the Elder. Natural History. II 138–139. cited by Briquel Maurus Servius Honoratus. Ad Aeneidem. I 42; XI 259.) (Note: Saturn's lightning bolts are those of wintertime.) Hence the mastership he has on agriculture and wealth cannot be that of a god of the third function, i.e. of production, wealth, and pleasure, but it stems from his magical lordship over creation and destruction. Although these features are to be found in Greek god Cronus as well, it appears that those features were proper to Roman Saturn's most ancient aspects, such as his presence on the Capitol and his association with Jupiter, who in the stories of the arrival of the Pelasgians in the land of the Sicels and that of the Argei orders human sacrifices to him.

Briquel concludes that Saturn was a sovereign god of a time that the Romans perceived as no longer actual, that of the legendary origins of the world, before civilization.

==== Roman cult practices ====
Sacrifices to Saturn were performed according to "Greek rite" (ritus graecus), with the head uncovered, in contrast to those of other major Roman deities, which were performed capite velato, "with the head covered." Saturn himself, however, was represented as veiled (involutus), as for example in a wall painting from Pompeii that shows him holding a sickle and covered with a white veil. This feature is in complete accord with the character of a sovereign god of the Varunian type and is common with German god Odin. Briquel remarks Servius had already seen that the choice of the Greek rite was due to the fact that the god himself is imagined and represented as veiled, thence his sacrifice cannot be carried out by a veiled man: This is an instance of the reversal of the current order of things typical of the nature of the deity as appears in its festival. (Note: Maurus Servius Honoratus. Ad Aenaeidem. III 407. cited by Briquel) Plutarch writes his figure is veiled because he is the father of truth. (Note: Plutarch. Quaestiones Romanae. II. cited by Briquel)

Pliny notes that the cult statue of Saturn was filled with oil; the exact meaning of this is unclear. Its feet were bound with wool, which was removed only during the Saturnalia. The fact that the statue was filled with oil and the feet were bound with wool may relate back to the myth of "The Castration of Uranus". In this myth Rhea gives Cronus a rock to eat in Zeus's stead, thus tricking Cronus. Although mastership of knots is a feature of Greek origin it is also typical of the Varunian sovereign figure, as apparent e.g. in Odin. Once Zeus was victorious over Cronus, he sets this stone up at Delphi and constantly it is anointed with oil and strands of unwoven wool are placed on it. The stone wore a red cloak, and was brought out of the temple to take part in ritual processions and lectisternia, banquets at which images of the gods were arranged as guests on couches. All these ceremonial details identify a sovereign figure.

==== Cult outside Rome ====
Little evidence exists in Italy for the cult of Saturn outside Rome, but his name resembles that of the Etruscan god Satres. (Note: Found on the Piacenza Liver; see also Martianus Capella 1.58; Mueller (2010).) The potential cruelty of Saturn was enhanced by his identification with Cronus, known for devouring his own children. He was thus used in translation when referring to gods from other cultures the Romans perceived as severe; he was equated with the Carthaginian god Baal Hammon, to whom children were sacrificed, and to Yahweh, whose Sabbath was referred to as Saturni dies, "Saturn's day," in a poem by Tibullus, who wrote during the reign of Augustus; eventually this gave rise to the word "Saturday" in English. The identification with Ba'al Hammon later gave rise to the African Saturn, a cult that enjoyed great popularity until the 4th century. Besides being a popular cult it also had the character of a mystery religion and required child sacrifices. It is also considered as inclining to monotheism. In the ceremony of initiation the myste (initiate) "intrat sub iugum" ("enters beneath the yoke"), a ritual that Le Glay compares to the Roman tigillum sororium. Even though their origin and theology are completely different, the Italic and the African god are both sovereign and master over time and death, a fact that has permitted their association. However, the African Saturn is not directly derived from the Italic god, but rather from his Greek counterpart, Cronus.

=== Saturnalia ===
Saturn is associated with a major religious festival in the Roman calendar, Saturnalia. Saturnalia celebrated the harvest and sowing, and ran from December 17–23. During Saturnalia, the social restrictions of Rome were relaxed. The figure of Saturn, kept during the year with its legs bound in wool, was released from its bindings for the period of the festival. The revelries of Saturnalia were supposed to reflect the conditions of the lost "Golden Age" before the rule of Saturn was overthrown, not all of them desirable, except as a temporary relief from civilized constraint. The Greek equivalent was the Kronia.

Macrobius (5th century CE) presents an interpretation of the Saturnalia as a festival of light leading to the winter solstice. The renewal of light and the coming of the new year was celebrated in the later Roman Empire at the Dies Natalis of Sol Invictus, the "Birthday of the Unconquerable Sun," on December 25.

== Roman legend ==
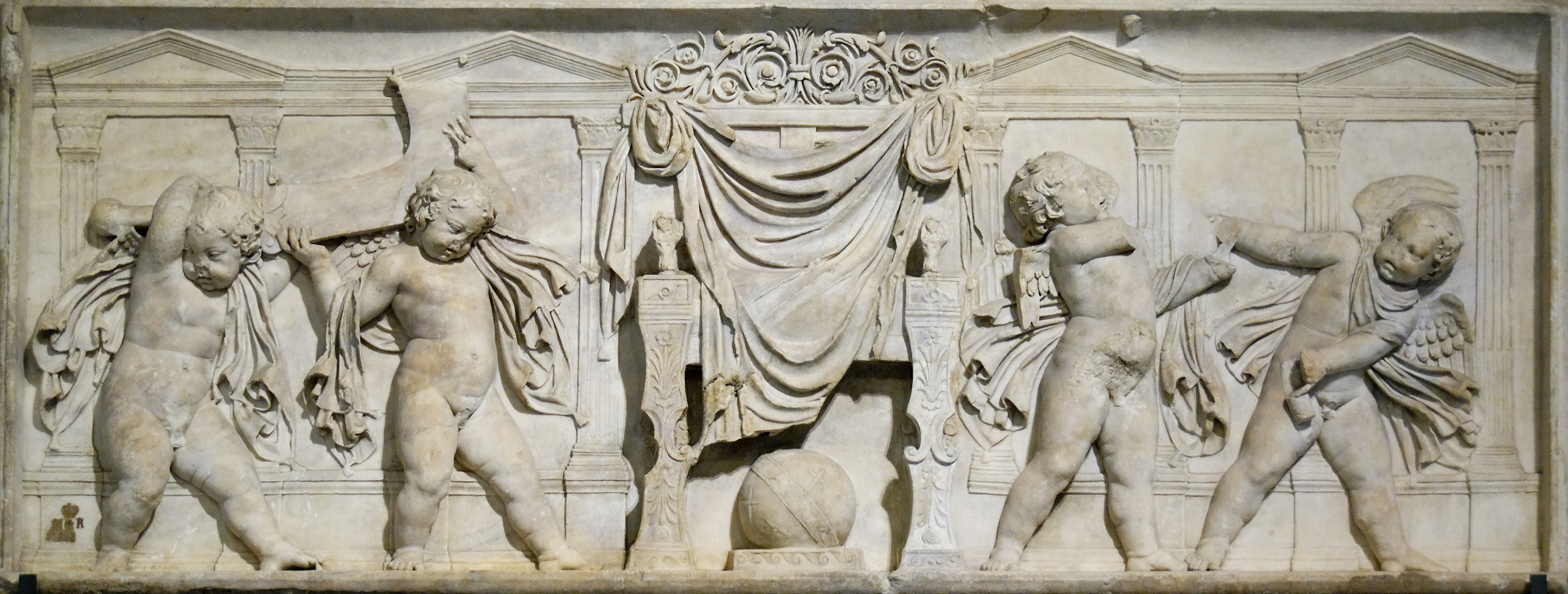
Relief held by the Louvre thought to depict the veiled throne of Saturn, either a Roman work of the 1st century CE or a Renaissance copy

It was customary for the Romans to represent divine figures as kings of Latium at the time of their legendary origins. Macrobius states explicitly that the Roman legend of Janus and Saturn is an affabulation, as the true meaning of religious beliefs cannot be openly expressed. In the myth Saturn was the original and autochthonous ruler of the Capitolium, which had thus been called the Mons Saturnius in older times and on which once stood the town of Saturnia. (Note: Marcus Terentius Varro. Lingua Latina. V 42 and 45. Vergil. Aeneis. VIII 357-358. Dionysius of Halicarnassus. Roman Antiquities. I 34. Festus. Saturnia. 322 L. Pliny the Elder. Natural History. III 68. Minucius Felix. Octavius. 22. Tertullian. Apologeticum. 10. cited by Briquel) He was sometimes regarded as the first king of Latium or even the whole of Italy. At the same time, there was a tradition that Saturn had been an immigrant god, received by Janus after he was usurped by his son Jupiter and expelled from Greece. (Note: The Roman theologian Marcus Terentius Varro listed Saturn among the Sabine gods.) In the view of H. S. Versnel, inconsistencies such as being a foreigner with one of Rome's oldest sanctuaries, or a god of liberation who is kept in fetters most of the year, indicate Saturn's capacity for confounding social distinctions.

The Golden Age of Saturn's reign in Roman mythology differed from the Greek tradition. He arrived in Italy "dethroned and fugitive," but brought agriculture and civilization for which he was rewarded by Janus with a share of the kingdom, becoming himself king. As the Augustan poet Virgil described it, "He gathered together the unruly race" of fauns and nymphs "scattered over mountain heights, and gave them laws ... . Under his reign were the golden ages men tell of: in such perfect peace he ruled the nations." (Note: Virgil. Aeneid. 8.320–325. cited by Versnel) He was considered the ancestor of the Latin nation as he fathered Picus, the first king of Latium, who married Janus' daughter Canens and in his turn fathered Faunus.

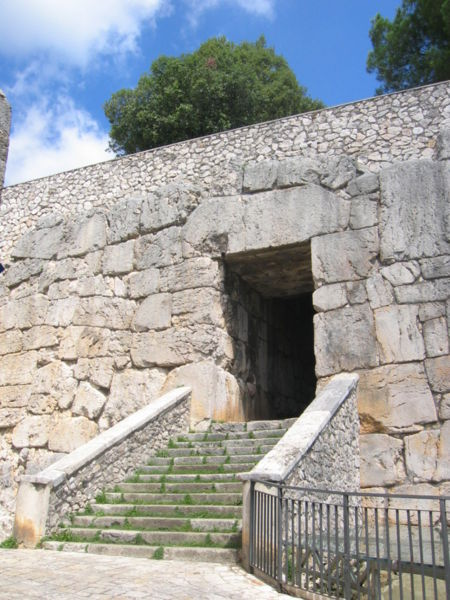
Alatri's main gate of the cyclopean walls

Saturn was also said to have founded the five Saturnian towns of Latium: Aletrium (today Alatri), Anagnia (Anagni), Arpinum (Arpino), Atina, and Ferentinum (Ferentino, also known as Antinum) all located in the Latin Valley, province of Frosinone. All these towns are surrounded by cyclopean walls; their foundation is traditionally ascribed to the Pelasgians.

But Saturn also had a less benevolent aspect, as indicated by the blood shed in his honor during gladiatorial munera. His consort in archaic Roman tradition was Lua, sometimes called Lua Saturni ("Saturn's Lua") and identified with Lua Mater, "Mother Destruction," a goddess in whose honor the weapons of enemies killed in war were burned, perhaps as expiation. Versnel, however, proposed that Lua Saturni should not be identified with Lua Mater, but rather refers to "loosening"; she thus represents the liberating function of Saturn.

== Gladiatorial munera ==
Saturn's chthonic nature connected him to the underworld and its ruler Dis Pater, the Roman equivalent of Greek Plouton (Pluto in Latin) who was also a god of hidden wealth. (Note: See also the Etruscan god Satre.) In 3rd-century AD sources and later, Saturn is recorded as receiving gladiatorial offerings (munera) during or near the Saturnalia. (Note: For instance, Ausonius. Eclogue. 23. and De feriis Romanis. 33–37. See Versnel and Wiedemann, Thomas E.J. (1995) [1992]. Emperors and Gladiators. Routledge. p. 47.) These gladiator combats, ten days in all throughout December, were presented by the quaestors and sponsored with funds from the treasury of Saturn. (Note: Eight days were subsidized from the Imperial treasury ( arca fisci ) and two mostly by the sponsoring magistrate himself.)

The practice of gladiatorial munera was criticized by Christian apologists as a form of human sacrifice. Although there is no evidence of this practice during the Republican era, the offering of gladiators led to later theorizing that the primeval Saturn had demanded human victims. Macrobius says that Dis Pater was placated with human heads and Saturn with sacrificial victims consisting of men (virorum victimis). The figurines that were exchanged as gifts (sigillaria) during the Saturnalia may have represented token substitutes. (Note: For other Roman practices that may represent substitutes for human sacrifice, see Argei and oscilla, the latter of which were used also at the Latin Festival and the Compitalia.)

== On coins ==
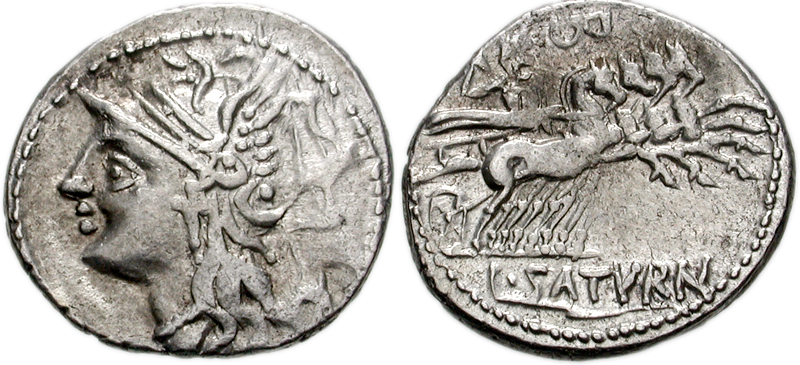
Saturn driving a quadriga on the reverse of a denarius issued by Saturninus

In 104 BCE, the plebeian tribune Lucius Appuleius Saturninus issued a denarius depicting Saturn driving a four-horse chariot (quadriga), a vehicle associated with rulers, triumphing generals, and sun gods. Saturninus was a popularist politician who had proposed reduced-price grain distribution to the poor of Rome. The head of the goddess Roma appears on the obverse. The Saturnian imagery played on the tribune's name and his intent to alter the social hierarchy to his advantage, by basing his political support on the common people (plebs) rather than the senatorial elite.

== See also ==
- Planets in astrology § Saturn
- Satre (Etruscan god)
- Saturnalia

== Bibliography ==
- Georges Dumézil (1974) La religion romaine archaïque Paris Payot 2nd; Italian translation (expanded version) La religione romana arcaica Milano Rizzoli 1977. Edizione e traduzione a cura di Furio Jesi.
- Dominique Briquel (1981) "Jupiter, Saturne et le Capitol. Essai de comparaison indoeuropéenne" in Revue de l' histoire des religions 198 2. pp. 131–162.
- Marcel Leglay (1966) Saturne africain. Histoire BEFAR Paris de Boccard.
- H.S. Versnel (1993, 1994) "Saturnus and the Saturnalia", in Inconsistencies in Greek and Roman Religion: Transition and Reversal in Myth and Ritual, Brill, pp. 144–145.
