= Saturnalia =

Ancient Roman festival in December

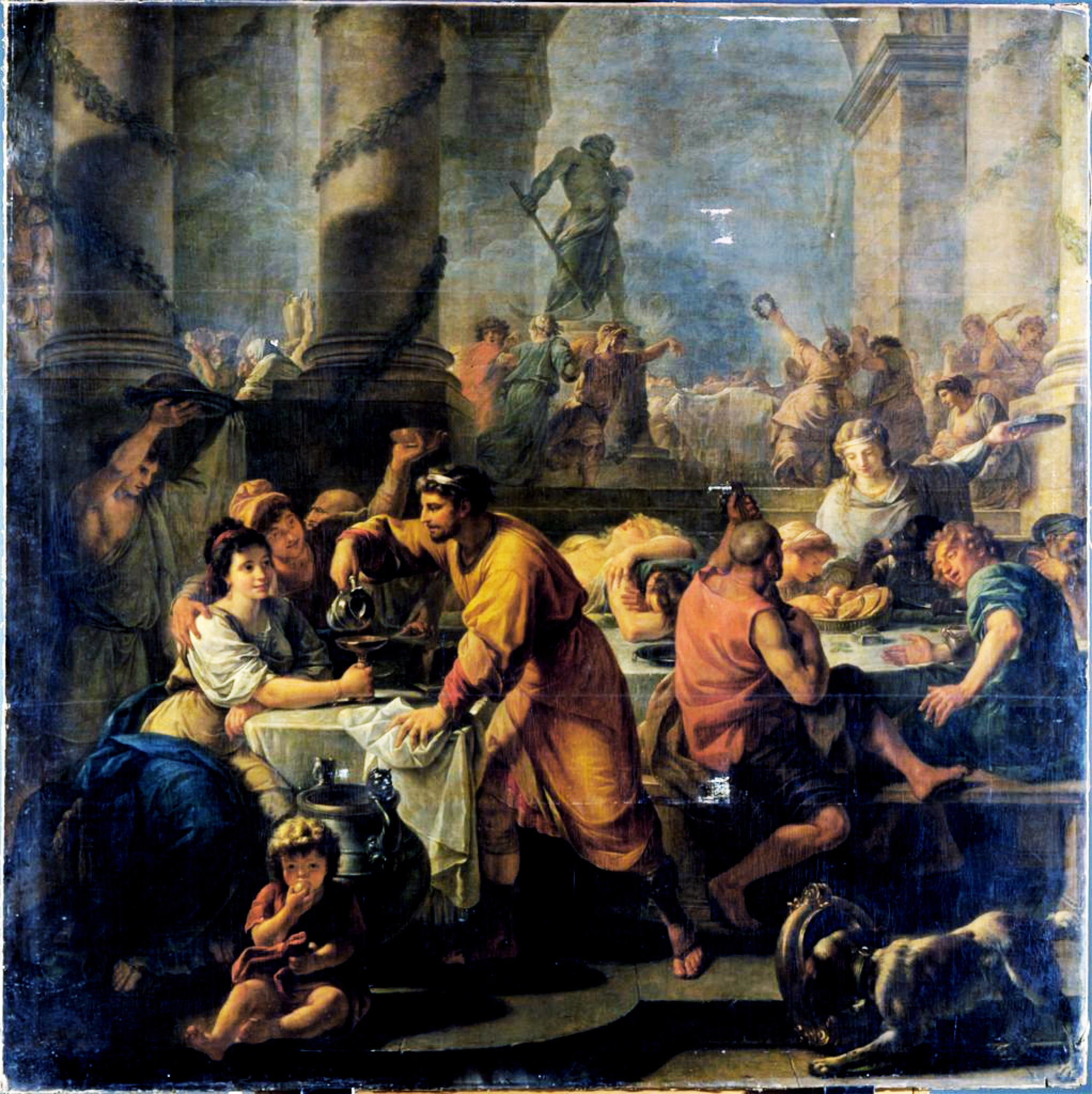
- Saturnalia (1783) by Antoine-François Callet, showing his interpretation of what the Saturnalia might have looked like
- Observed by: Romans
- Type: Classical Roman religion
- Significance: Public festival
- Celebrations: Feasting, role reversals, gift-giving, gambling
- Observances: Public sacrifice and banquet for the god Saturn; universal wearing of the pileus
- Date: 17–23 December

Saturnalia is an ancient Roman festival and holiday in honour of the god Saturn, held on 17 December in the Julian calendar and later expanded with festivities until 19 December. By the 1st century BC, the celebration had been extended until 23 December, for a total of seven days of festivities. The holiday was celebrated with a sacrifice at the Temple of Saturn, in the Roman Forum, and a public banquet, followed by private gift-giving, continual partying, and a carnival atmosphere that overturned Roman social norms: gambling was permitted, and masters provided table service for their slaves as it was seen as a time of liberty for both slaves and freedmen alike. A common custom was the election of a "King of the Saturnalia", who gave orders to people, which were followed and presided over the merrymaking. The gifts exchanged were usually gag gifts or small figurines made of wax or pottery known as sigillaria. The poet Catullus called it "the best of days".

Saturnalia was the Roman equivalent and descendant of the earlier Greek holiday of Kronia, which was celebrated during the Attic month of Hekatombaion in late midsummer, lasting one day. The Saturnalia was celebrated by the Greeks in the Roman Empire as well, under its old Greek name (Ancient Greek: Κρόνια).

It held theological importance for some Romans, who saw it as a restoration of the ancient Golden Age, when the world was ruled by Saturn. The Neoplatonist philosopher Porphyry interpreted the freedom associated with Saturnalia as symbolizing the "freeing of souls into immortality". Saturnalia may have influenced some of the customs associated with later celebrations in western Europe occurring in midwinter, particularly traditions associated with Christmas, the Feast of the Holy Innocents, and Epiphany. In particular, the historical western European Christmas custom of electing a "Lord of Misrule" may have its roots in Saturnalia celebrations.

== Origins ==
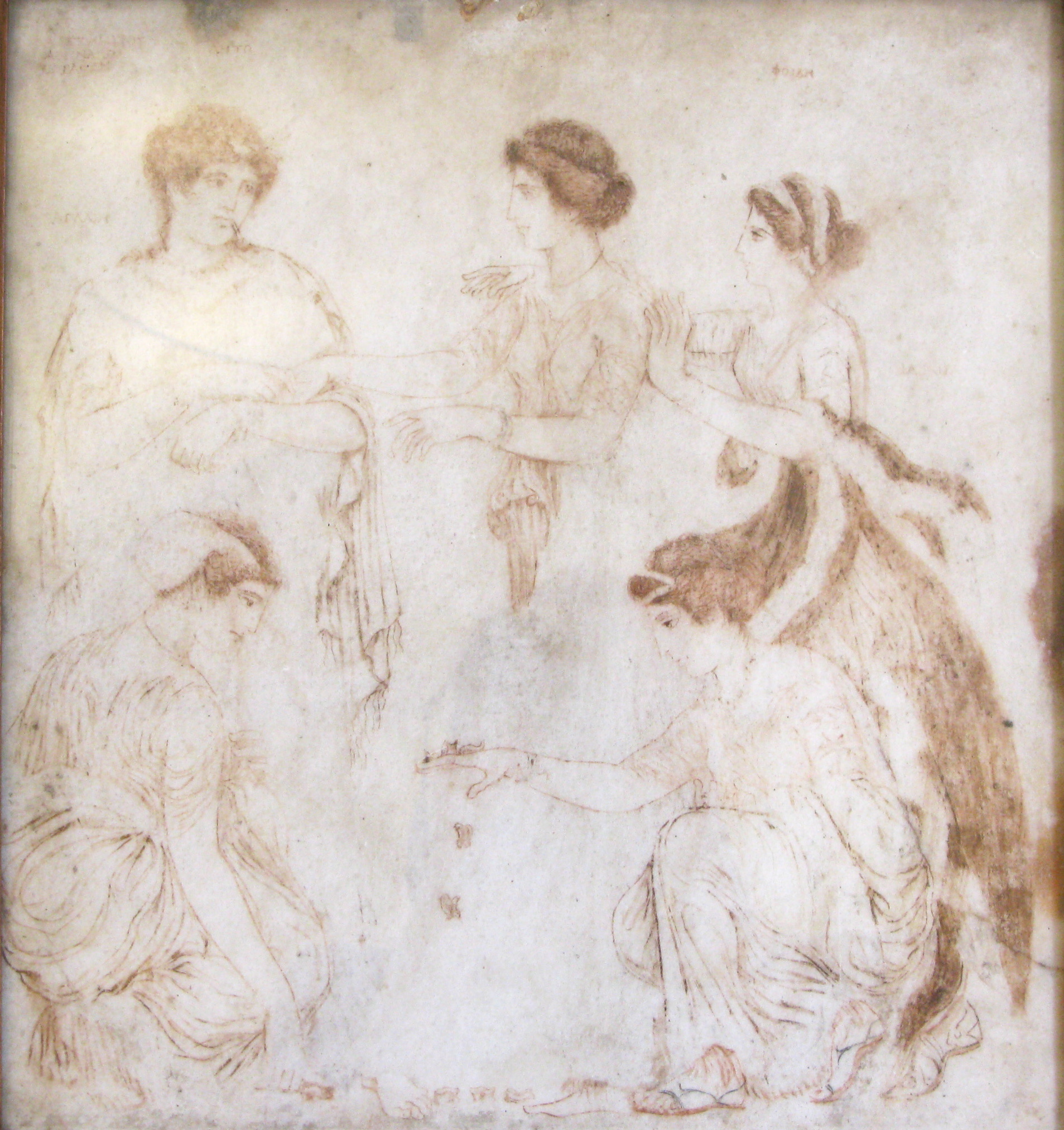
Ancient Greek painting signed by "Alexander of Athens", discovered in Herculaneum, showing five women playing knucklebones, a game which was played during the Attic holiday of Kronia

In Roman mythology, Saturn was an agricultural deity who was said to have reigned over the world in the Golden Age, when humans enjoyed the spontaneous bounty of the earth without labour in a state of innocence. The revelries of Saturnalia were supposed to reflect the conditions of the lost mythical age. The Greek equivalent was the Kronia, which was celebrated on the twelfth day of the month of Hekatombaion, which occurred from around mid-July to mid-August on the Attic calendar.

The Greek writer Athenaeus cites numerous other examples of similar festivals celebrated throughout the Greco-Roman world, including the Cretan festival of Hermaia in honor of Hermes, an unnamed festival from Troezen in honor of Poseidon, the Thessalian festival of Peloria in honor of Zeus Pelorios, and an unnamed festival from Babylon. He also mentions that the custom of masters dining with their slaves was associated with the Athenian festival of Anthesteria and the Spartan festival of Hyacinthia. The Argive festival of Hybristica, though not directly related to the Saturnalia, involved a similar reversal of roles in which women would dress as men and men would dress as women.

The ancient Roman historian Justinus credits Saturn with being a historical king of the pre-Roman inhabitants of Italy:

"The first inhabitants of Italy were the Aborigines, whose king, Saturnus, is said to have been a man of such extraordinary justice, that no one was a slave in his reign, or had any private property, but all things were common to all, and undivided, as one estate for the use of every one; in memory of which way of life, it has been ordered that at the Saturnalia slaves should everywhere sit down with their masters at the entertainments, the rank of all being made equal."

— Justinus, Epitome of Pompeius Trogus 43.3

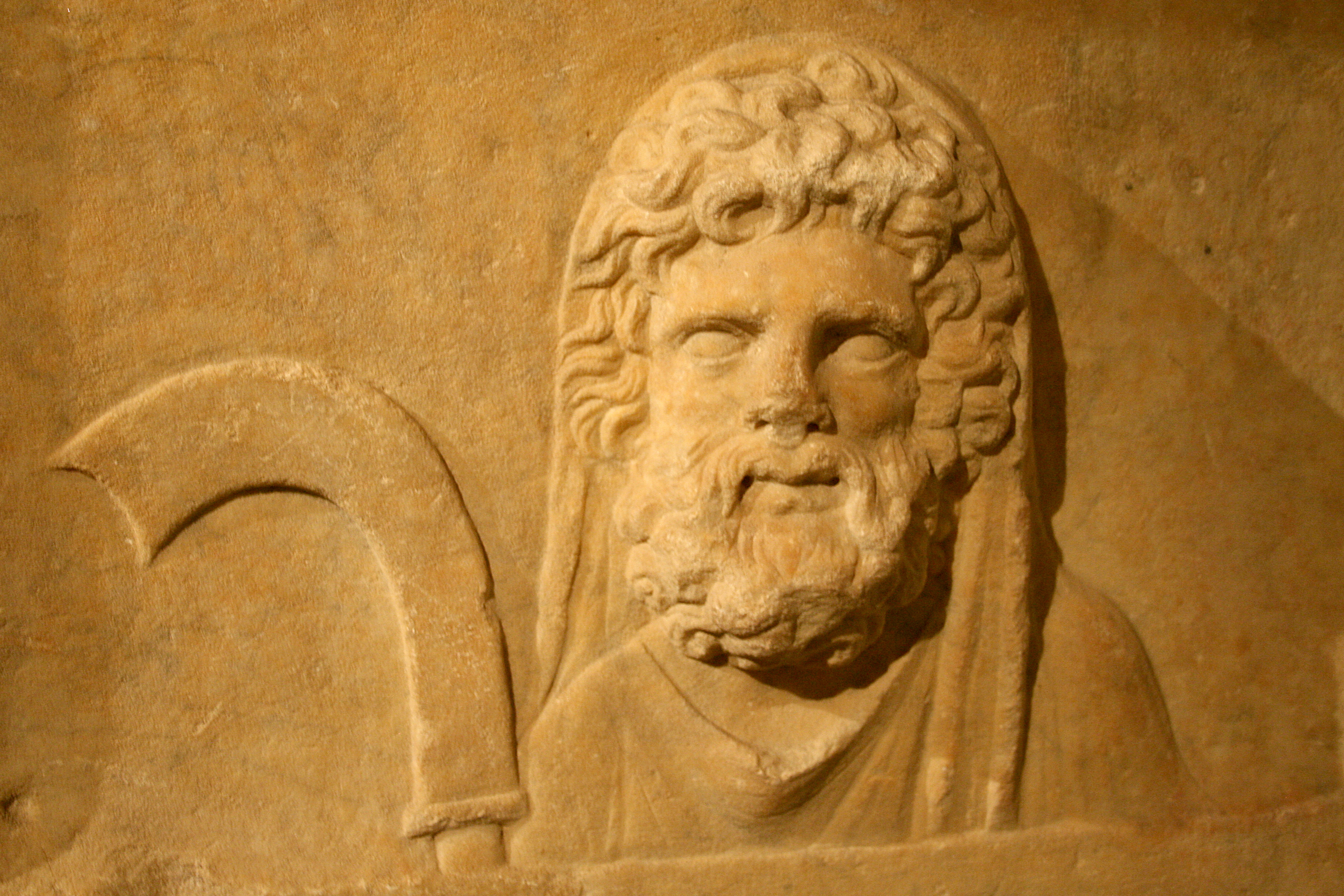
2nd-century CE Roman bas-relief depicting the god Saturn, in whose honor the Saturnalia was celebrated, holding a scythe.

Although probably the best-known Roman holiday, Saturnalia as a whole is not described from beginning to end in any single ancient source. Modern understanding of the festival is pieced together from several accounts dealing with various aspects. The Saturnalia was the dramatic setting of the multivolume work of that name by Macrobius, a Latin writer from late antiquity who is the major source for information about the holiday. Macrobius describes the reign of Justinus's "king Saturn" as "a time of great happiness, both on account of the universal plenty that prevailed and because as yet there was no division into bond and free – as one may gather from the complete license enjoyed by slaves at the Saturnalia." In Lucian's Saturnalia it is Chronos himself who proclaims a "festive season, when 'tis lawful to be drunken, and slaves have license to revile their lords".

Another explanation for the holiday is found is the Babylonian Talmud, where it is discussed that the origins of this holiday came from Adam, the first man.

In one of the interpretations in Macrobius's work, Saturnalia is a festival of light leading to the winter solstice, with the abundant presence of candles symbolizing the quest for knowledge and truth. The renewal of light and the coming of the new year was celebrated in the later Roman Empire at the Dies Natalis Solis Invicti, the "Birthday of the Unconquerable Sun", on 25 December.

The popularity of Saturnalia continued into the 3rd and 4th centuries CE, and as the Roman Empire came under Christian rule, many of its customs were recast into or at least influenced the seasonal celebrations surrounding Christmas and the New Year.

== Historical context ==
Saturnalia underwent a major reform in 217 BC, after the Battle of Lake Trasimene, when the Romans suffered one of their most crushing defeats by Carthage during the Second Punic War. Until that time, they had celebrated the holiday according to Roman custom (more Romano). It was after a consultation of the Sibylline Books that they adopted "Greek rite", introducing sacrifices carried out in the Greek manner, the public banquet, and the continual shouts of io Saturnalia that became characteristic of the celebration. Cato the Elder (234–149 BC) remembered a time before the so-called "Greek" elements had been added to the Roman Saturnalia.

It was not unusual for the Romans to offer cult (cultus) to the deities of other nations in the hope of redirecting their favour (see evocatio), and the Second Punic War in particular created pressures on Roman society that led to a number of religious innovations and reforms. Robert E.A. Palmer has argued that the introduction of new rites at this time was in part an effort to appease Ba'al Hammon, the Carthaginian god who was regarded as the counterpart of the Roman Saturn and Greek Cronus. The table service that masters offered their slaves thus would have extended to Carthaginian or African war captives.

== Public religious observance ==
=== Rite at the temple of Saturn ===
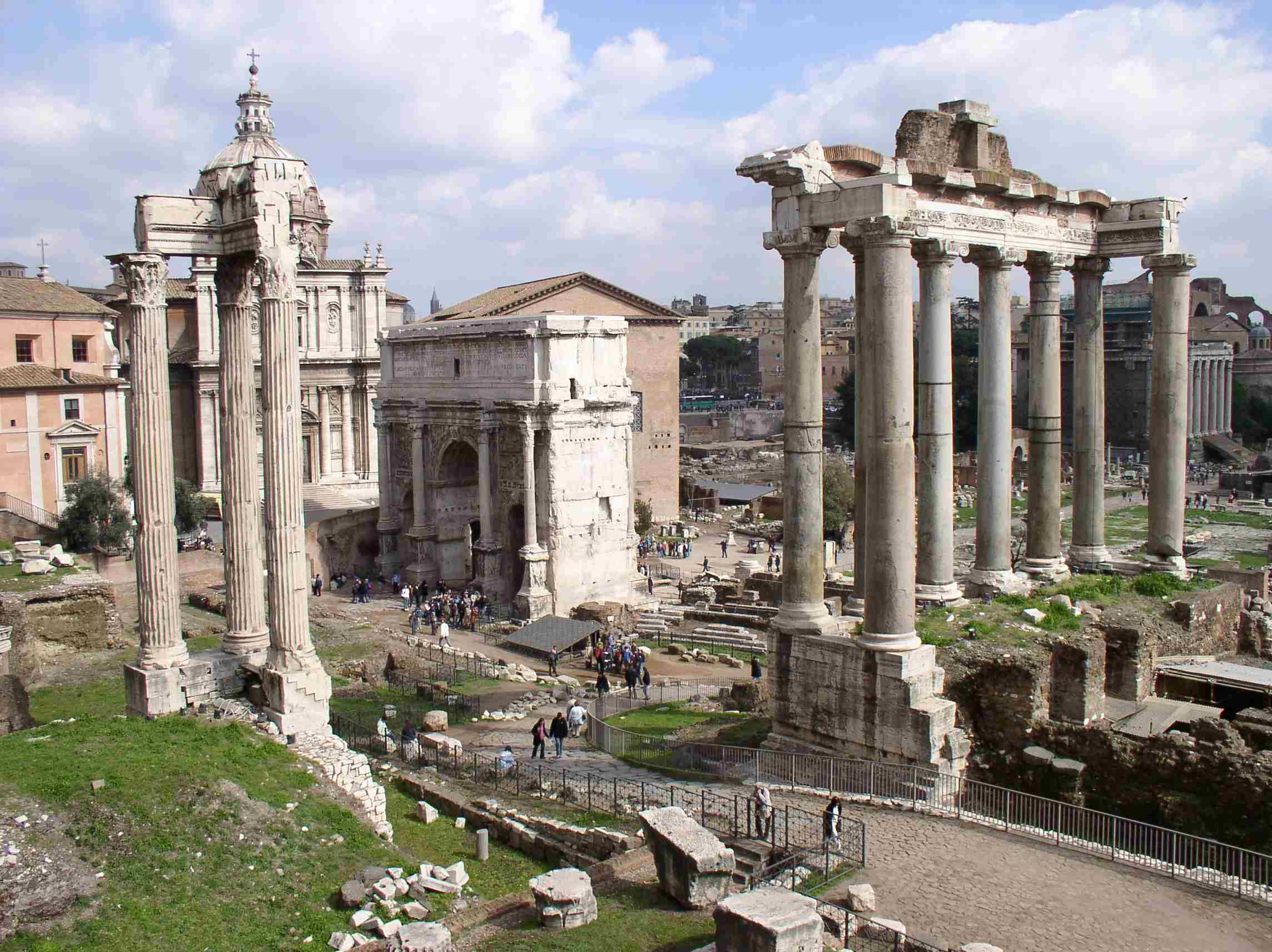
Ruins of the Temple of Saturn (eight columns on right) in Rome, traditionally said to have been constructed in 497 BC

The statue of Saturn at his main temple normally had its feet bound in wool, which was removed for the holiday as an act of liberation. The official rituals were carried out according to "Greek rite" (ritus graecus). The sacrifice was officiated by a priest, whose head was uncovered; in Roman rite, priests sacrificed capite velato, with head covered by a special fold of the toga. This procedure is usually explained by Saturn's assimilation with his Greek counterpart Cronus, since the Romans often adopted and reinterpreted Greek myths, iconography, and even religious practices for their own deities, but the uncovering of the priest's head may also be one of the Saturnalian reversals, the opposite of what was normal.

Following the sacrifice the Roman Senate arranged a lectisternium, a ritual of Greek origin that typically involved placing a deity's image on a sumptuous couch, as if he were present and actively participating in the festivities. A public banquet followed (convivium publicum).

The day was supposed to be a holiday from all forms of work. Schools were closed, and exercise regimens were suspended. Courts were not in session, so no justice was administered, and no declaration of war could be made. After the public rituals, observances continued at home. On 18 and 19 December, which were also holidays from public business, families conducted domestic rituals. They bathed early, and those with means sacrificed a suckling pig, a traditional offering to an earth deity.

=== Human offerings ===
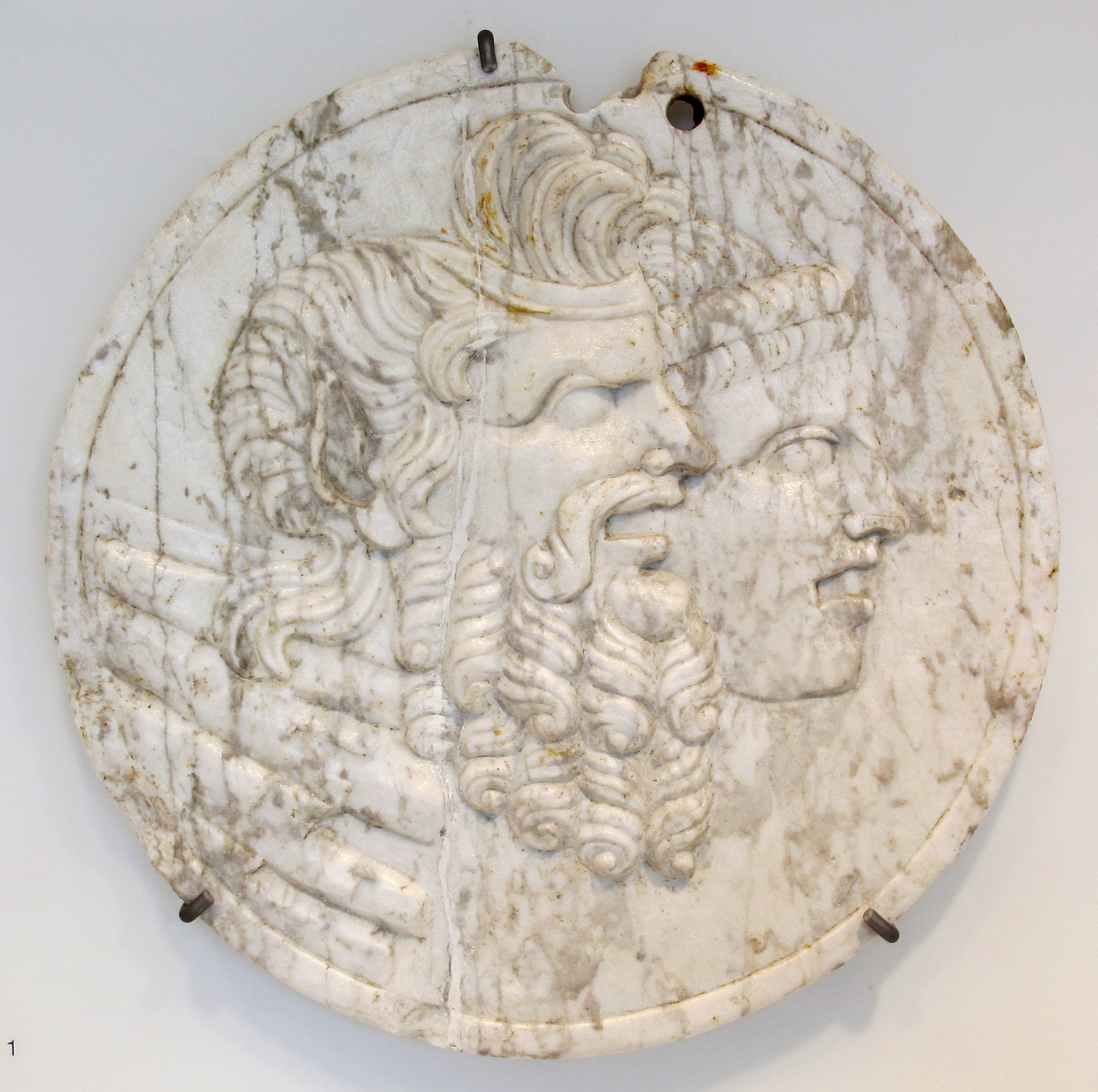
During Saturnalia, the Romans offered oscillum, effigies of human heads, in place of real human heads.

Saturn also had a less benevolent aspect. One of his consorts was Lua, sometimes called Lua Saturni ("Saturn's Lua") and identified with Lua Mater, "Mother Destruction", a goddess in whose honor the weapons of enemies killed in war were burned, perhaps in expiation. Saturn's chthonic nature connected him to the underworld and its ruler Dīs Pater, the Roman equivalent of Greek Plouton (Pluto in Latin) who was also a god of hidden wealth. In sources of the third century AD and later, Saturn is recorded as receiving dead gladiators as offerings (munera) during or near the Saturnalia. These gladiatorial events, ten days in all throughout December, were presented mainly by the quaestors and sponsored with funds from the treasury of Saturn.

The practice of gladiator munera was criticized by Christian apologists as a form of human sacrifice. Although there is no evidence of this practice during the Republic, the offering of gladiators led to later theories that the primeval Saturn had demanded human victims in order for Saturnalia to occur. Macrobius says that Dīs Pater was placated with human heads and Saturn with sacrificial victims consisting of men (virorum victimis). In mythic lore, during the visit of Hercules to Italy, the civilizing demigod insisted that the practice be halted and the ritual reinterpreted. Instead of heads to Dīs Pater, the Romans were to offer effigies or masks (oscilla); a mask appears in the representation of Saturnalia in the Calendar of Filocalus. Since the Greek word phota meant both 'man' and 'lights', candles were a substitute offering to Saturn for the light of life. The figurines that were exchanged as gifts (sigillaria) may also have represented token substitutes.

== Private festivities ==
"Meanwhile, the head of the slave household, whose responsibility it was to offer sacrifice to the Penates, to manage the provisions and to direct the activities of the domestic servants, came to tell his master that the household had feasted according to the annual ritual custom. For at this festival, in houses that keep to proper religious usage, they first of all honor the slaves with a dinner prepared as if for the master; and only afterwards is the table set again for the head of the household. So, then, the chief slave came in to announce the time of dinner and to summon the masters to the table."

— Macrobius, Saturnalia 1.24.22–23

=== Role reversal ===
Saturnalia was characterized by role reversals and behavioral license. Slaves were treated to a banquet of the kind usually enjoyed by their masters. Ancient sources differ on the circumstances: some suggest that master and slave dined together, while others indicate that the slaves feasted first, or that the masters actually served the food. The practice might have varied over time.

Saturnalian license also permitted slaves to disrespect their masters without the threat of a punishment. It was a time for free speech: the Augustan poet Horace calls it "December liberty". In two satires set during the Saturnalia, Horace has a slave offer sharp criticism to his master. Everyone knew, however, that the leveling of the social hierarchy was temporary and had limits; no social norms were ultimately threatened, because the holiday would end.

The toga, the characteristic garment of the male Roman citizen, was set aside in favor of the Greek synthesis, colourful "dinner clothes" otherwise considered in poor taste for daytime wear. Romans of citizen status normally went about bare-headed, but for the Saturnalia donned the pilleus, the conical felt cap that was the usual mark of a freedman. Slaves, who ordinarily were not entitled to wear the pilleus, wore it as well, so that everyone was "pilleated" without distinction.

The participation of freeborn Roman women is implied by sources that name gifts for women, but their presence at banquets may have depended on the custom of their time; from the late Republic onward, women mingled socially with men more freely than they had in earlier times. Female entertainers were certainly present at some otherwise all-male gatherings. Role-playing was implicit in the Saturnalia's status reversals, and there are hints of mask-wearing or "guising". No theatrical events are mentioned in connection with the festivities, but the classicist Erich Segal saw Roman comedy, with its cast of impudent, free-wheeling slaves and libertine seniors, as imbued with the Saturnalian spirit.

=== Gambling ===
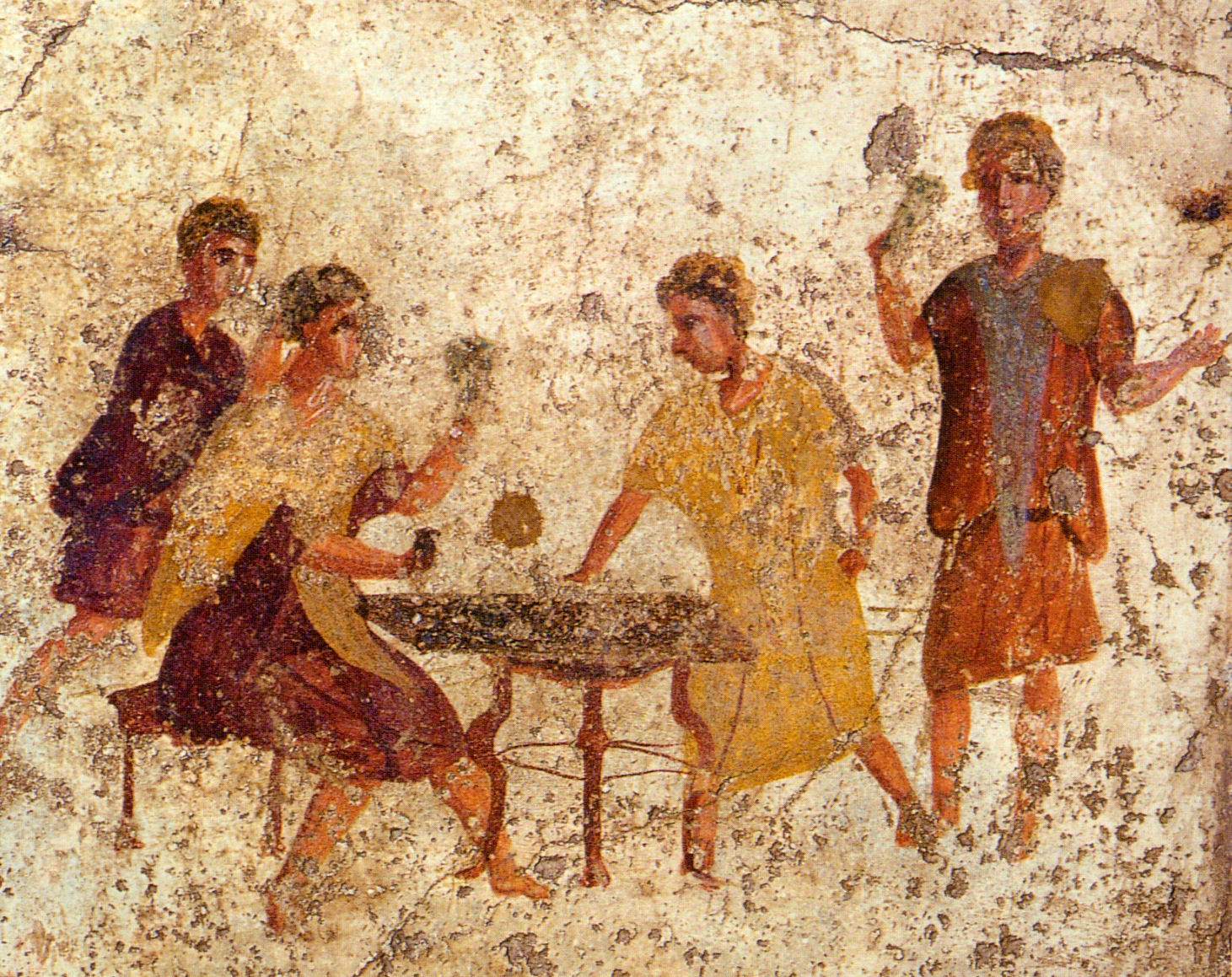
Dice players in a wall painting from Pompeii

Gambling and dice-playing, normally prohibited or at least frowned upon, were permitted for all, even slaves. Coins and nuts were the stakes. On the Calendar of Philocalus, the Saturnalia is represented by a man wearing a fur-trimmed coat next to a table with dice, and a caption reading: "Now you have license, slave, to game with your master." Rampant overeating and drunkenness became the rule, and a sober person the exception.

Seneca looked forward to the holiday, if somewhat tentatively, in a letter to a friend:

"It is now the month of December, when the greatest part of the city is in a bustle. Loose reins are given to public dissipation; everywhere you may hear the sound of great preparations, as if there were some real difference between the days devoted to Saturn and those for transacting business. ... Were you here, I would willingly confer with you as to the plan of our conduct; whether we should eve in our usual way, or, to avoid singularity, both take a better supper and throw off the toga."

Some Romans found it all a bit much. Pliny describes a secluded suite of rooms in his Laurentine villa, which he used as a retreat: "... especially during the Saturnalia when the rest of the house is noisy with the licence of the holiday and festive cries. This way I don't hamper the games of my people and they don't hinder my work or studies."

=== Gift-giving ===
The Sigillaria on 19 December was a day of gift-giving. Because gifts of value would mark social status contrary to the spirit of the season, these were often the pottery or wax figurines called sigillaria made specially for the day, candles, or "gag gifts", of which Augustus was particularly fond. Children received toys as gifts. In his many poems about the Saturnalia, Martial names both expensive and quite cheap gifts, including writing tablets, dice, knucklebones, moneyboxes, combs, toothpicks, a hat, a hunting knife, an axe, various lamps, balls, perfumes, pipes, a pig, a sausage, a parrot, tables, cups, spoons, items of clothing, statues, masks, books, and pets. Gifts might be as costly as a slave or exotic animal, but Martial suggests that token gifts of low intrinsic value inversely measure the high quality of a friendship. Patrons or "bosses" might pass along a gratuity (sigillaricium) to their poorer clients or dependents to help them buy gifts. Some emperors were noted for their devoted observance of the Sigillaria.

In a practice that might be compared to modern greeting cards, verses sometimes accompanied the gifts. Martial has a collection of poems written as if to be attached to gifts. Catullus received a book of bad poems by "the worst poet of all time" as a joke from a friend.

Gift-giving was not confined to the day of the Sigillaria. In some households, guests and family members received gifts after the feast in which slaves had shared.

=== King of the Saturnalia ===
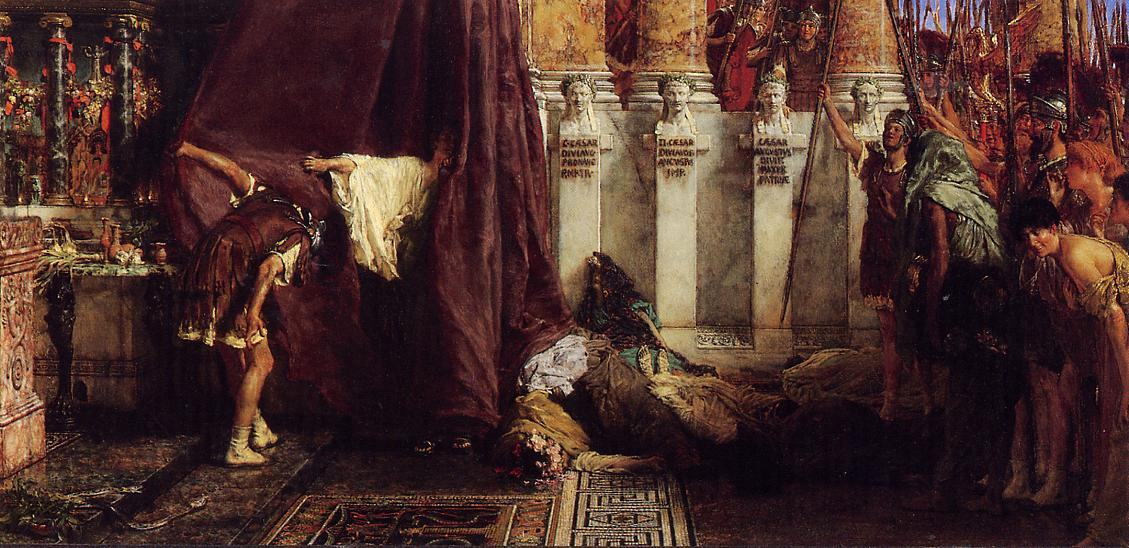
Ave, Caesar! Io, Saturnalia! (1880) by Lawrence Alma-Tadema. The painting's title draws a comparison between the spontaneous declaration of Claudius as the new emperor by the Praetorian Guard after the assassination of Caligula and the election of a Saturnalicius princeps.

Imperial sources refer to a Saturnalicius princeps ("Ruler of the Saturnalia"), who ruled as master of ceremonies for the proceedings. He was appointed by lot, and has been compared to the medieval Lord of Misrule at the Feast of Fools. His capricious commands, such as "Sing naked!" or "Throw him into cold water!", had to be obeyed by the other guests at the convivium: he creates and (mis)rules a chaotic and absurd world. The future emperor Nero is recorded as playing the role in his youth.

Since this figure does not appear in accounts from the Republican period, the princeps of the Saturnalia may have developed as a satiric response to the new era of rule by a princeps, the title assumed by the first emperor Augustus to avoid the hated connotations of the word "king" (rex). Art and literature under Augustus celebrated his reign as a new Golden Age, but the Saturnalia makes a mockery of a world in which law is determined by one man and the traditional social and political networks are reduced to the power of the emperor over his subjects. In a poem about a lavish Saturnalia under Domitian, Statius makes it clear that the emperor, like Jupiter, still reigns during the temporary return of Saturn.

=== Io Saturnalia ===
The phrase io Saturnalia was the characteristic shout or salutation of the festival, originally commencing after the public banquet on the single day of 17 December. The interjection io (Greek ἰώ, ǐō) is pronounced either with two syllables (a short i and a long o) or as a single syllable (with the i becoming the Latin consonantal j and pronounced yō). It was a strongly emotive ritual exclamation or invocation, used for instance in announcing triumph or celebrating Bacchus, but also to punctuate a joke.

== On the calendar ==
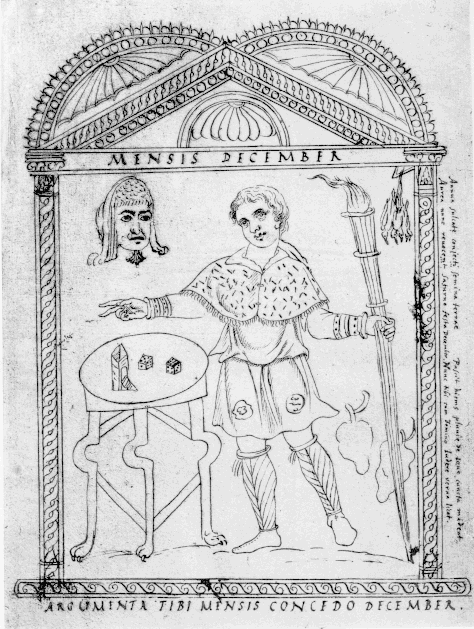
Drawing from the Chronography of 354 (a calendar of the year 354 produced by Filocalus) depicting the month of December, with Saturnalian dice on the table and a mask (oscilla) hanging above

As an observance of state religion, Saturnalia was supposed to have been held "... quarto decimo Kalendarum Ianuariarum", on the fourteenth day before the Kalends of January (1 January), counting inclusively. In the pre-Julian, twenty-nine day December, on the oldest Roman religious calendar, which the Romans believed to have been established by the legendary founder Romulus and his successor Numa Pompilius, Saturnalia would be held on 17 December. It was a dies festus, a legal holiday when no public business could be conducted. The day marked the dedication anniversary (dies natalis) of the Temple to Saturn in the Roman Forum in 497 BC. When Julius Caesar had the calendar reformed because it had fallen out of synchronization with the solar year, two days were added to the month, and the date of Saturnalia then changed, still falling on 17 December, but with this now being the sixteenth day before the Kalends, as per the Roman reckoning of dates of this time. It was felt, thus, that the original day had thus been moved by two days, and so Saturnalia was celebrated under Augustus as a three-day official holiday encompassing both dates.

By the late Republic, the private festivities of Saturnalia had expanded to seven days, but during the Imperial period contracted variously to three to five days. Caligula extended official observances to five.

The date 17 December was the first day of the astrological sign Capricorn, the house of Saturn, the planet named for the god. Its proximity to the winter solstice (21 to 23 December on the Julian calendar) was endowed with various meanings by both ancient and modern scholars: for instance, the widespread use of wax candles (cerei, singular cereus) could refer to "the returning power of the sun's light after the solstice".

== Ancient theological and philosophical views ==
=== Roman ===
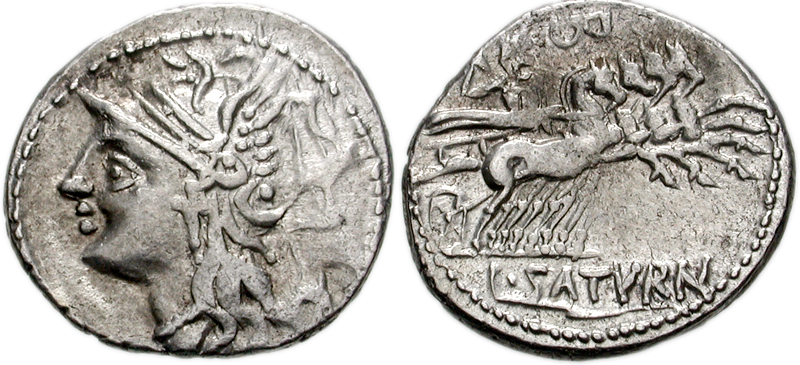
Saturn driving a four-horse chariot (quadriga) on the reverse of a denarius issued in 104 BC by the plebeian tribune Saturninus, with the head of the goddess Roma on the obverse: Saturninus was a popularist politician whose Saturnian imagery played on his name and evoked both his program of grain distribution to aid the poor and his intent to subvert the social hierarchy, all ideas associated with the Saturnalia.

The Saturnalia reflects the contradictory nature of the deity Saturn himself: "There are joyful and utopian aspects of careless well-being side by side with disquieting elements of threat and danger."

As a deity of agricultural bounty, Saturn embodied prosperity and wealth in general. The name of his consort Ops meant "wealth, resources". Her festival, Opalia, was celebrated on 19 December. The Temple of Saturn housed the state treasury (aerarium Saturni) and was the administrative headquarters of the quaestors, the public officials whose duties included oversight of the mint. It was among the oldest cult sites in Rome, and had been the location of "a very ancient" altar (ara) even before the building of the first temple in 497 BC.

The Romans regarded Saturn as the original and autochthonous ruler of the Capitolium, and the first king of Latium or even the whole of Italy. At the same time, there was a tradition that Saturn had been an immigrant deity, received by Janus after he was usurped by his son Jupiter (Zeus) and expelled from Greece. His contradictions—a foreigner with one of Rome's oldest sanctuaries, and a god of liberation who is kept in fetters most of the year—indicate Saturn's capacity for obliterating social distinctions.

Roman mythology of the Golden Age of Saturn's reign differed from the Greek tradition. He arrived in Italy "dethroned and fugitive", but brought agriculture and civilization and became a king. As the Augustan poet Virgil described it:

"[H]e gathered together the unruly race [of fauns and nymphs] scattered over mountain heights, and gave them laws .... Under his reign were the golden ages men tell of: in such perfect peace he ruled the nations."

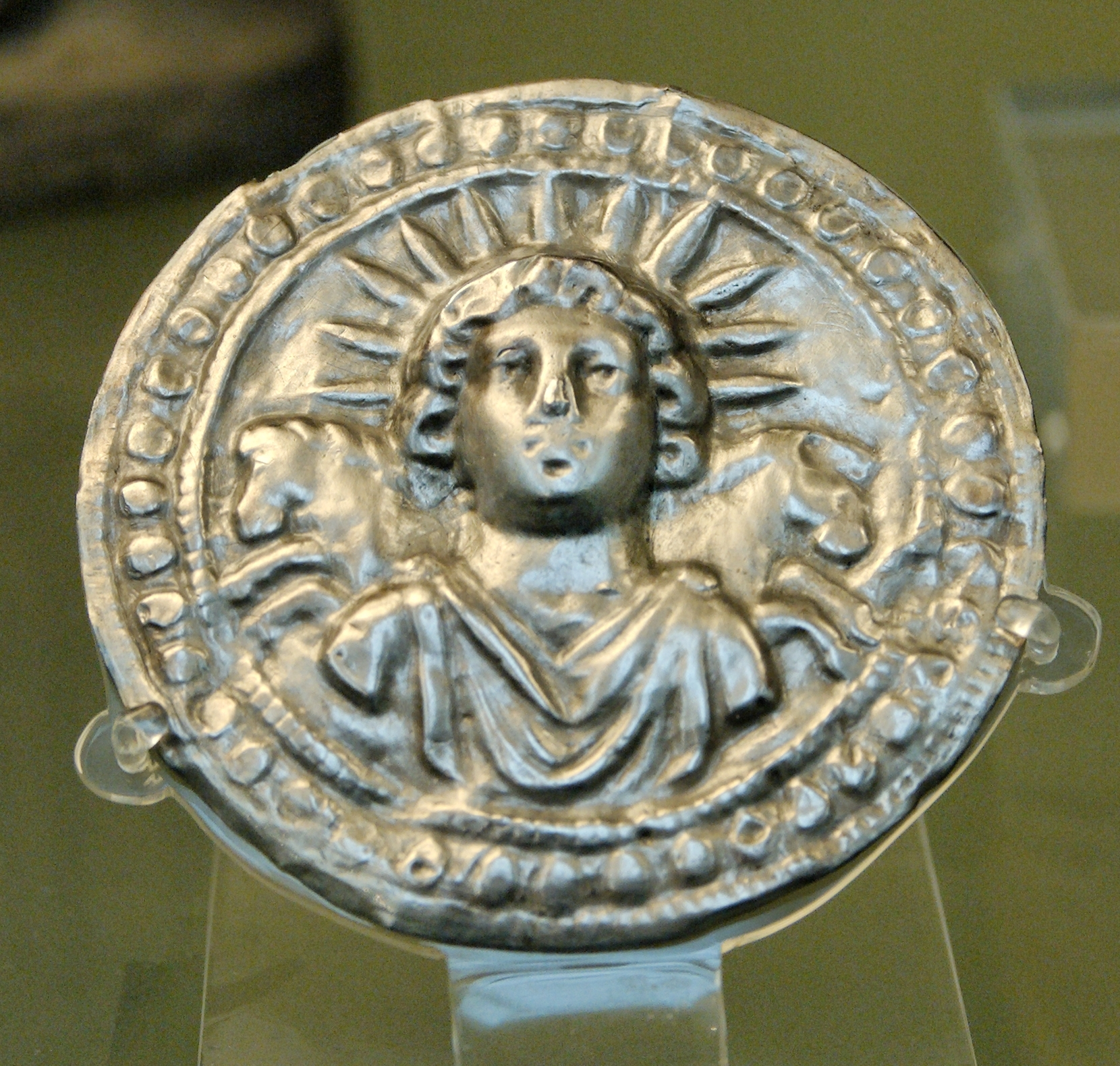
Roman disc in silver depicting Sol Invictus (from Pessinus in Phrygia, 3rd century AD)

The third century Neoplatonic philosopher Porphyry took an allegorical view of the Saturnalia. He saw the festival's theme of liberation and dissolution as representing the "freeing of souls into immortality"—an interpretation that Mithraists may also have followed, since they included many slaves and freedmen. According to Porphyry, the Saturnalia occurred near the winter solstice because the sun enters Capricorn, the astrological house of Saturn, at that time. In the Saturnalia of Macrobius, the proximity of the Saturnalia to the winter solstice leads to an exposition of solar monotheism, the belief that the Sun (see Sol Invictus) ultimately encompasses all divinities as one.

=== Jewish ===
M. Avodah Zarah lists Saturnalia as a "festival of the gentiles," along with the Calends of January and Kratesis. (Note: קלנטס וסטרנלייא Kalends and Saturnalia in MSS Kaufmann A50 and Parma A (de Rossi 138). The spelling is the same in both, though Kaufmann's waw-conjunctive is the work of a later scribe and the phrase has been struck through in Parma A. All Mishnaic printings have edited the spellings toward the Kalenda and Saturnura of b. Avodah Zarah MSS.) B. Avodah Zarah records that Ḥanan b. Rava said, "Kalends (Note: קלנדא Kalenda in extant MSS; however Ḥananel b. Ḥushiel quotes s.v. "קלנדס" Kalends.) is held during the eight days after the [winter] solstice and Saturnura (Note: MSS variants: Saturnaya, Saturnurya. This is likely a pun on סתר-נורא satar-nura "cloaking of the flame"; i.e. the shortening of the day which the solstice represents. In all printings of b. Avodah Zarah, the final mention of the holiday has been corrected to Saturnalia, though all MSS read Saturnura as before.) begins eight days before the [winter] solstice". Ḥananel b. Ḥushiel, followed by Rashi, claims: "Eight days before the solstice -- their festival was for all eight days," which slightly overstates the Saturnalia's historical six-day length, possibly to associate the holiday with Hanukkah.

In the Jerusalem Talmud, Avodah Zarah claims the etymology of Saturnalia is שנאה טמונה śinʾâ ṭǝmûnâ "hidden hatred," and refers to the hatred Esau, whom the Rabbis believed had fathered Rome, harbored for Jacob.

The Babylonian Talmud's Avodah Zarah ascribes the origins of Saturnalia (and Kalends) to Adam, who saw that the days were getting shorter and thought it was punishment for his sin:

When the First Man saw that the day was continuously shortening, he said, "Woe is me! Because I have sinned, the world darkens around me, and returns to formlessness and void. This is the death to which Heaven has sentenced me!" He decided to spend eight days in fasting and prayer. When he saw the winter solstice, and he saw that the day was continuously lengthening, he said, "It is the order of the world!" He went and feasted for eight days. The following year, he feasted for both. He established them in Heaven's name, but they established them in the name of idolatry.

In the Babylonian Avodah Zarah, this etiology is attributed to the tannaim, but the story is suspiciously similar to the etiology of Kalends attributed by the Jerusalem Avodah Zarah to Abba Arikha.

== Influence ==
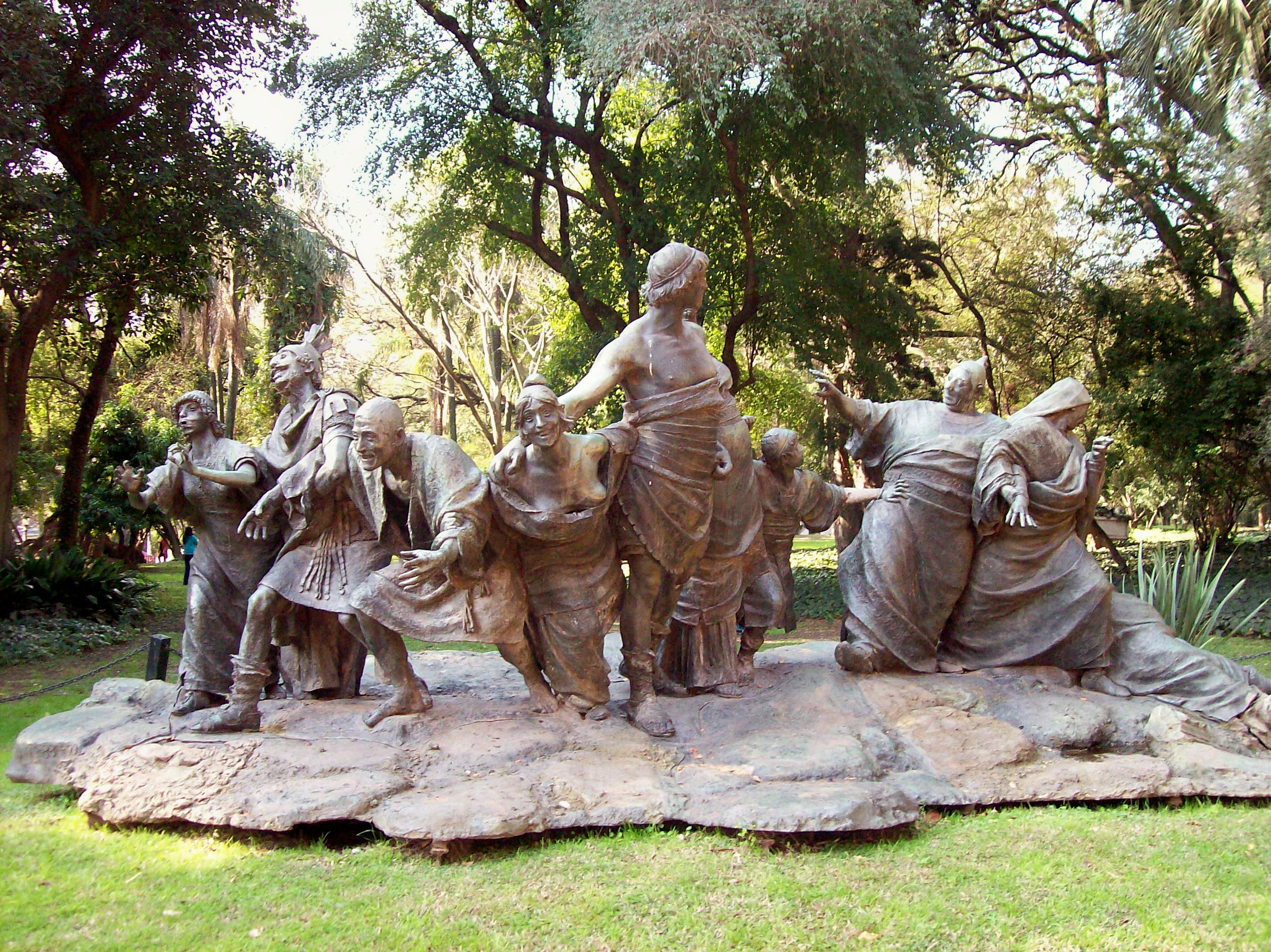
Saturnalia (1909) by Ernesto Biondi, in the Buenos Aires Botanical Gardens

Unlike several Roman religious festivals which were particular to cult sites in the city, the prolonged seasonal celebration of Saturnalia at home could be held anywhere in the Empire. Saturnalia continued as a secular celebration long after it was removed from the official calendar. As William Warde Fowler notes: "[Saturnalia] has left its traces and found its parallels in great numbers of medieval and modern customs, occurring about the time of the winter solstice."

The date of Jesus's birth is unknown. A spurious correspondence between Cyril of Jerusalem and Pope Julius I (337–352), quoted by John of Nikiu in the 9th century, is sometimes given as a source for a claim that, in the fourth century AD, Pope Julius I decreed that the birth of Jesus be celebrated on 25 December. Some speculate that the date was chosen to create a Christian replacement or alternative to Saturnalia and the birthday festival of Sol Invictus, held on 25 December. Around AD 200, Tertullian had berated Christians for continuing to celebrate the pagan Saturnalia festival. The Church may have hoped to attract more converts to Christianity by allowing them to continue to celebrate on the same day. The Church may have also been influenced by the idea that Jesus was conceived and died on the same date; Jesus died during Passover and, in the third century AD, Passover was celebrated on 25 March. The Church may have calculated Jesus's birthday as nine months later, on 25 December. But in fact the correspondence is spurious.

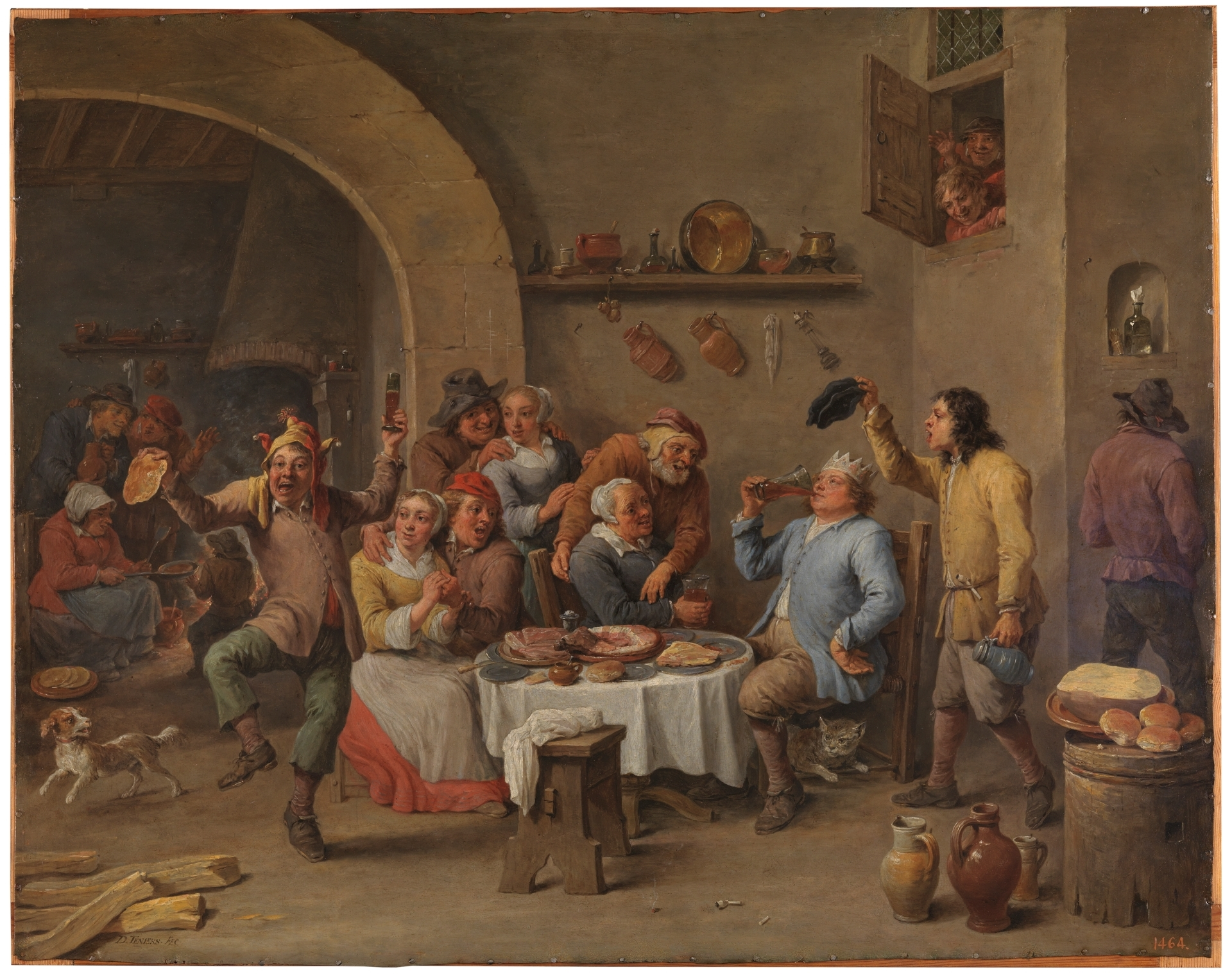
The King Drinks (between 1634 and 1640) by David Teniers the Younger, showing a Twelfth Night celebration with a "Lord of Misrule"

As a result of the close proximity of dates, many Christians in western Europe continued to celebrate traditional Saturnalia customs in association with Christmas and the surrounding holidays. Like Saturnalia, Christmas during the Middle Ages was a time of ruckus, drinking, gambling, and overeating. The tradition of the Saturnalicius princeps was particularly influential. In medieval France and Switzerland, a boy would be elected "bishop for a day" on 28 December (the Feast of the Holy Innocents) and would issue decrees much like the Saturnalicius princeps. The boy bishop's tenure ended during the evening vespers. This custom was common across western Europe, but varied considerably by region; in some places, the boy bishop's orders could become quite rowdy and unrestrained, but, in others, his power was only ceremonial. In some parts of France, during the boy bishop's tenure, the actual clergy would wear masks or dress in women's clothing, a reversal of roles in line with the traditional character of Saturnalia.

During the late medieval period and early Renaissance, many towns in England elected a "Lord of Misrule" at Christmas time to preside over the Feast of Fools. This custom was sometimes associated with the Twelfth Night or Epiphany. A common tradition in western Europe was to drop a bean, coin, or other small token into a cake or pudding; whoever found the object would become the "King (or Queen) of the Bean". During the Protestant Reformation, reformers sought to revise or even completely abolish such practices, which they regarded as "popish"; these efforts were largely successful. The Puritans banned the "Lord of Misrule" in England and the custom was largely forgotten shortly thereafter, though the bean in the pudding survived as a tradition of a small gift to the one finding a single almond hidden in the traditional Christmas porridge in Scandinavia.

Nonetheless, in the middle of the nineteenth century, some of the old ceremonies, such as gift-giving, were revived in English-speaking countries as part of a widespread "Christmas revival". During this revival, authors such as Charles Dickens sought to reform the "conscience of Christmas" and turn the formerly riotous holiday into a family-friendly occasion. Vestiges of the Saturnalia festivities may still be preserved in some of the traditions now associated with Christmas. The custom of gift-giving at Christmas time resembles the Roman tradition of giving sigillaria and the lighting of Advent candles resembles the Roman tradition of lighting torches and wax tapers. Likewise, Saturnalia and Christmas both share associations with eating, drinking, singing, and dancing.

== See also ==
- Bacchanalia
- Brumalia
- Yule
