= Kronia =

Athenian festival held in honor of Kronos (Cronus)

The Kronia or Cronia (Ancient Greek: Κρόνια) was an Athenian festival held in honor of Kronos (Cronus) on the 12th day of Hekatombaion, the first month of the Attic calendar, and roughly equivalent to the latter part of July and first part of August. (Note: For example, in 2024, the Kronia would fall on 17 July 2024.)

The festival was also celebrated in parts of Ionia, and in these places the month was called Kronion, named after the festival. (Note: Since the Kronia was significant enough to name the whole month Kronion, (something analogous to saying "Christmas" instead of "December") the event was important to the people of Ionia, regardless of the importance of Kronos / Cronus himself (which scholars find little evidence for).) Scholars usually interpret it as a celebration of the mid-summer (first) harvest. Its Roman equivalent is Saturnalia.

== Details from ancient sources ==
The Roman playwright Accius says that to celebrate the Kronia, "In nearly all fields and towns they happily feast upon banquets, and everyone waits upon his own servants." (Note: Lucius Accius. "fragment 3". [no title?]; cited in Bremmer (2008). Accius' purpose is to claim the Kronia as an influence on the Roman Saturnalia. (Note: The Saturnalia was held in honor of Saturn, the Roman's equivalent of Kronos / Cronus.)) Slaves and the free, rich and poor, all dined together and played games. (Note: Kronia games included dice (kyboi), knucklebones (astragaloi), and the board game pessoi.)

The freedom from work and social egalitarianism enjoyed on the day represented the conditions of the mythical Golden Age, when Kronos (Cronus) still ruled the world. In the Golden Age, the earth had spontaneously supported human life, and since labor was unneeded, slavery had not existed. (Note: The festivities are also described by the Roman-era Greek writer Lucian, who was probably describing the Saturnalia of his day rather than the Attic-Ionic Kronia.) William Hansen describes the Golden Age of Kronos as "a period of thorough harmony in which hierarchical, exploitative, and predatory relationships were nonexistent."

The Kronia was a time for social restraints to be temporarily forgotten. Slaves were released from their duties, and participated in the festivities alongside the slave-owners. Slaves were "permitted to run riot through the city, shouting and making a noise." Other than the Kronia, there is only limited evidence of religious devotion to Kronos (Cronus).

== See also ==
- Kronos (Cronus)
- Saturn (mythology)
- Saturnalia
