= Telesilla =

Ancient Greek poet

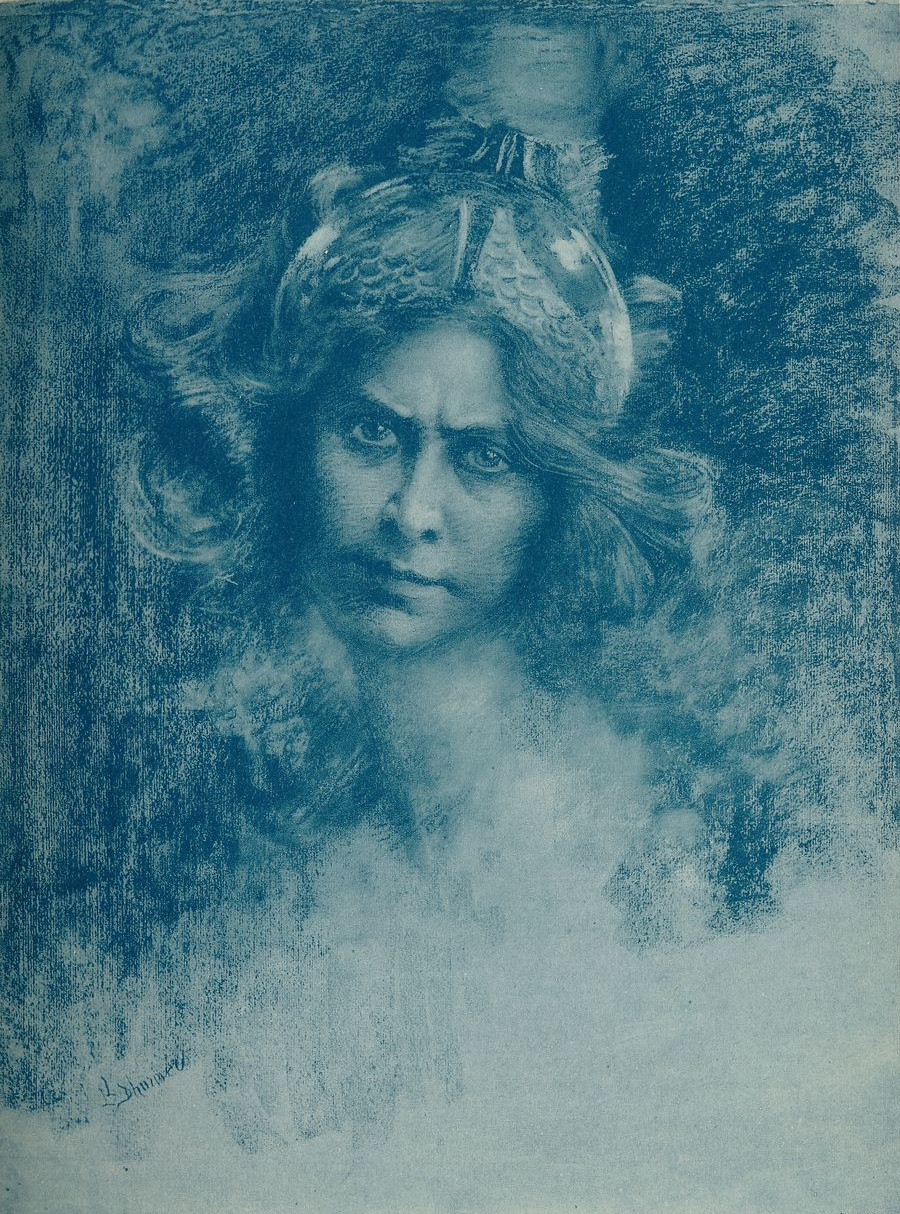
Illustration of Telesilla by Lucien Lévy-Dhurmer, from Les Kitharèdes by Renée Vivien

Telesilla (Ancient Greek: Τελέσιλλα) was an ancient Greek lyric poet from Argos, active in the fifth century BC. She is known for her role in the defence of Argos in 494 BC. The historicity of this episode continues to be disputed. Only a few fragments of her poetry survive, several of which reference the gods Apollo and Artemis. The longest surviving fragment, only two lines, is quoted by the grammarian Hephaestion to illustrate the Telesillan metre, named after her. She was apparently famous in antiquity, included by Antipater of Thessalonica in his canon of women poets; in the twentieth century she inspired a poem by the imagist poet H.D.

== Life ==
Little is known of Telesilla's life. She was from the Peloponnesian city of Argos. A tradition reported by both Plutarch and Pausanias associates her with the defence of the city after the Battle of Sepeia in 494 BC; according to Eusebius her floruit was around 450 BC. If both these dates are correct, she would have lived a relatively long life. Alternatively, Maria Elisabetta Colonna has proposed that she was born c. 490 BC. Plutarch says that Telesilla was from an aristocratic family; Martin Litchfield West suggests that she held a hereditary priesthood, as names beginning "Telesi–" were sometimes associated with such families.

Plutarch reports that Telesilla was sickly; on the instructions of an oracle she became a poet, and was cured. According to both Plutarch and Pausanias, when Cleomenes I of Sparta attacked Argos in 494 BC and defeated the Argive army at Sepeia, Telesilla organised the old men, slaves, and women of the city to defend it until the Spartans withdrew. Plutarch says that Telesilla's victory was celebrated by the festival of Hybristica. The battle is described by Herodotus, who does not mention Telesilla's defence of the city, and many modern scholars doubt the historicity of the story. Many other scholars such as R. A. Tomlinson and Jennifer Martinez Morales have argued that the story of women defending the city is plausible, though Tomlinson suggests that Telesilla's role was exaggerated. Dimitar Popov has argued that Telesilla was a victim of damnatio memoriae; that her role was downplayed because it contradicted patriarchal norms in Ancient Athens, and that some modern scholars have continued these prejudices by wrongly dismissing the military exploits of Telesilla.

== Poetry ==
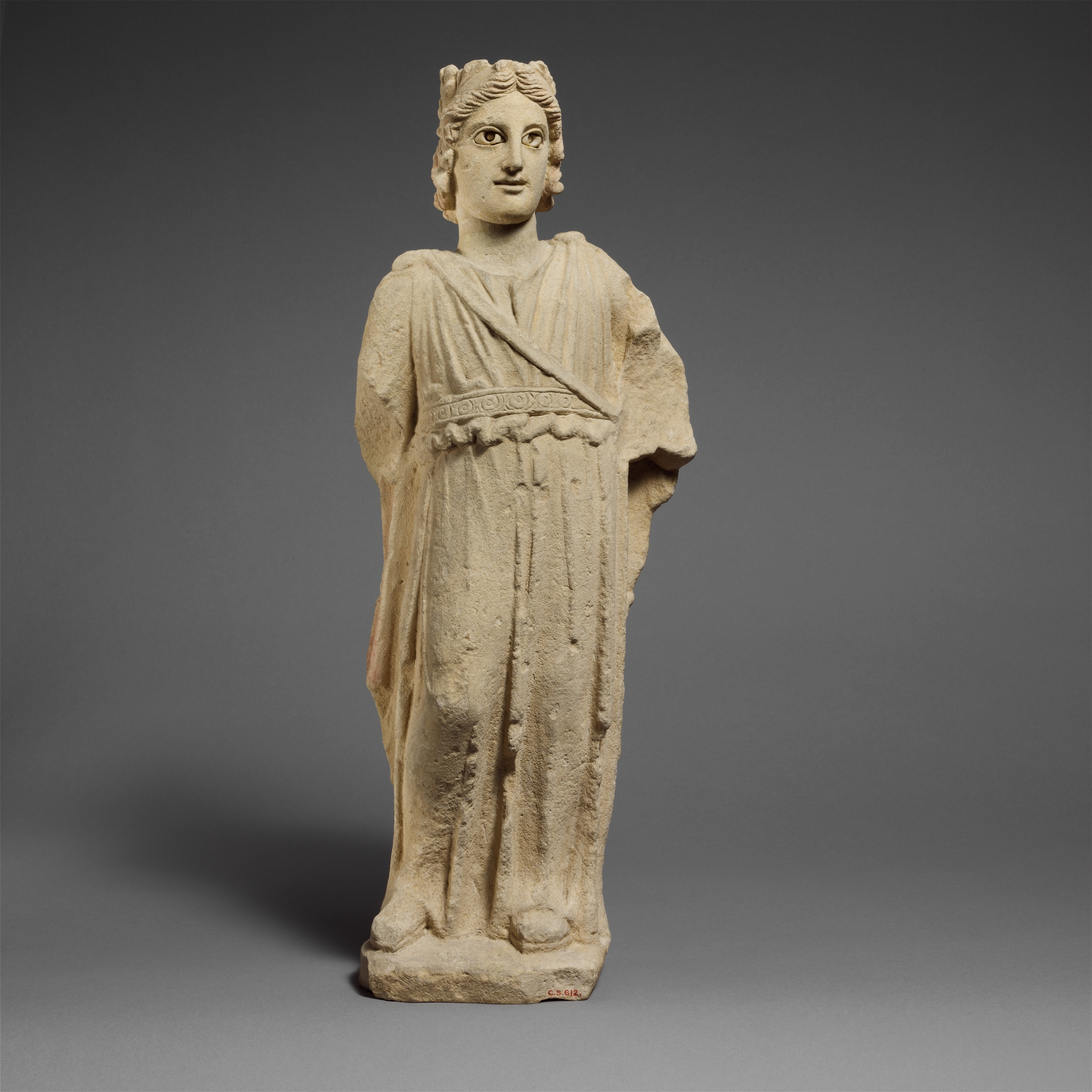
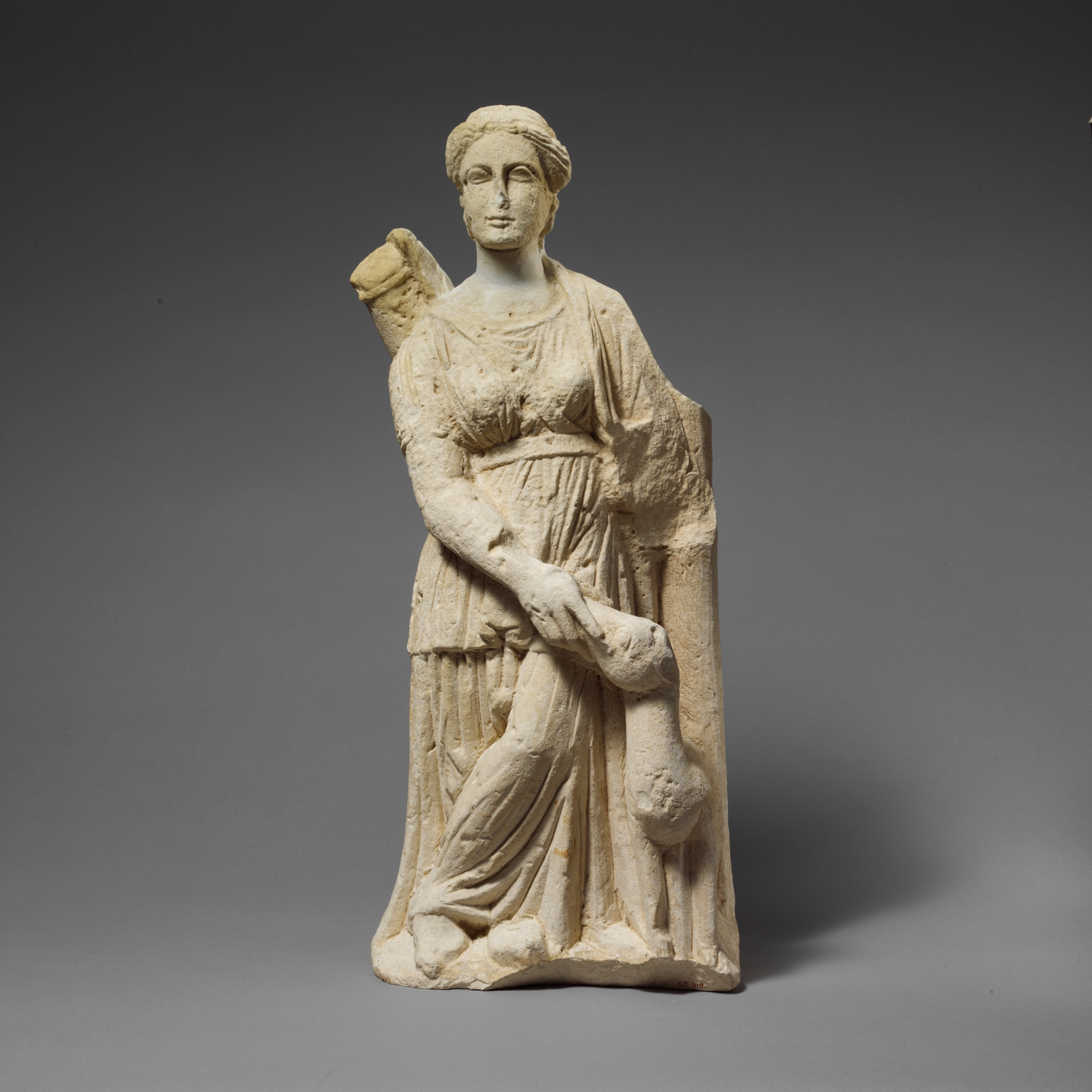
Five of Telesilla's surviving fragments relate to the gods Apollo (left) and Artemis (right)

Nine fragments of Telesilla's poetry survive in quotation or paraphrase, with only one being longer than a single word. What little survives suggests that, like Corinna, Telesilla concentrated on local legends. Both Pausanias and Plutarch state that she was well regarded by women in particular, and her surviving fragments suggest that she was interested in women's lives. Five fragments of her poetry relate to the gods Artemis and Apollo, and one apparently comes from a poem about the wedding of Zeus and Hera. According to Maximus of Tyre, Telesilla's poetry inspired the Argives. Umbertina Lisi suggested that this referred to war poetry, though Telesilla's surviving fragments are religious rather than martial.

A glyconic meter, the Telesillan, was named for her. The longest surviving fragment of Telesilla is two lines quoted by the grammarian Hephaestion to illustrate this meter, about the myth of Alpheus. It is addressed to "maidens" (κοραι), and was possibly a choral poem written for performance at a local festivals, used in the education of girls of noble families.

ἁ δ᾿ Ἄρτεμις, ὦ κόραι,
φεύγοισα τὸν Ἀλφεόν

— Telesilla, fr. 717 PMG
Translation:

And Artemis, girls, fleeing from Alpheus

— trans. David A. Campbell

Telesilla's poetry was apparently admired in antiquity. According to Eusebius she was as famous as Bacchylides, and Antipater of Thessalonica included her in his canon of nine women poets. According to Pausanias, there was a stele to Telesilla in front of the temple of Aphrodite in Argos which depicted her holding a helmet and with her poems on the ground around her, and Tatian reports that Niceratus sculpted her.

In the modern world, Telesilla inspired H.D.'s poem "Telesila", and she is included in Judy Chicago's Heritage Floor, accompanying the place setting for Aspasia in The Dinner Party.

== Works cited ==
- Balmer, Josephine (1996). Classical Women Poets. Bloodaxe Books. ISBN 1-85224-342-2.
- Bowman, Laurel (2004). "The 'Women's Tradition' in Greek Poetry". Phoenix. 58 (1). doi:10.2307/4135194. JSTOR 4135194.
- "Telesilla". Brooklyn Museum.
- Campbell, D. A. (1992). Greek Lyric Poetry IV: Bacchylides, Corinna, and Others. Cambridge, Massachusetts: Harvard University Press. ISBN 978-0-674-99508-6.
- Carey, Christopher (2012). "Telesilla". Oxford Classical Dictionary (4th ed.).
- Davies, Malcolm, ed. (2021). Lesser & Anonymous Fragments of Greek Lyric Poetry: A Commentary. Oxford: Oxford University Press. ISBN 978-0-19886050-1.
- Ingalls, Wayne B. (2000). "Ritual Performance as Training for Daughters in Archaic Greece". Phoenix. 54 (1): 1–20. doi:10.2307/1089087. JSTOR 1089087.
- Martinez Morales, Jennifer (2019). "Women on the Walls? The Role and Impact of Women in Classical Greek Sieges". In Armstrong, Jeremy; Trundle, Matthew (eds.). Brill's Companion to Sieges in the Ancient Mediterranean. Leiden: Brill. ISBN 9789004413740.
- Plant, I. M. (2004). Women Writers of Ancient Greece and Rome: an Anthology. Norman: University of Oklahoma Press. ISBN 9780806136226.
- Rayor, Diane J. (1991). Sappho's Lyre: Archaic Lyric and Women Poets of Ancient Greece. Berkeley: University of California Press. ISBN 978-0-520-07336-4.
- Robbins, Emmet (2006). "Telesilla". Brill's New Pauly. doi:10.1163/1574-9347_bnp_e1202980.
- Scott, Lionel (2005). Historical Commentary on Herodotus Book 6. Leiden: Brill. ISBN 978-90-47-40798-0.
- Snyder, Jane McIntosh (1991). The Woman and the Lyre: Women Writers in Classical Greece and Rome. Carbondale: SIU Press. ISBN 9780809335961.
- Tomlinson, R. A. (1972). Argos and the Argolid: From the End of the Bronze Age to the Roman Occupation. Ithaca: Cornell University Press. ISBN 0-8014-0713-3.
- West, M. L. (2011). "The Greek Poetess: Her Role and Image". Hellenica: Selected Papers on Greek Literature and Thought. Vol. III. Oxford: Oxford University Press. ISBN 9780199605033.
