= Sigillaria (ancient Rome) =

Ancient Roman gift

In ancient Roman culture, sigillaria were pottery or wax figurines given as traditional gifts during the Saturnalia. Sigillaria as a proper noun was also the name for the last day of the Saturnalia, December 23, and for a place where sigillaria were sold. A sigillarius was a person who made and sold sigillaria, perhaps as an offshoot of pottery manufacture.

The Via Sigillaria in Rome was a street dedicated to manufacturing and selling these gifts.

== The objects ==
"These statuettes were frequently made in the likeness of some divinity, such as Hercules, Minerva, Apollo Sauroctunus, Victory or of some celebrated mythological character (Danäe or Hyacinthus); failing this, of some purely fantastic type, such as a hermaphrodite or hunchback. These sigilla were sometimes made of clay, in which case their worth was but trifling, unless the workmanship possessed unusual merit; those made of marble, Corinthian bronze, silver or gold, were, however, frequently of considerable value."

In the dialogue of Macrobius's Saturnalia, the interlocutor Praetextatus says that sigillaria were substitutes for the sacrificial victims of the primitive religious rituals. Interpreted as such, they raise questions about human sacrifice among the earliest Romans (see also Argei and oscilla). The speaker Evangelus, however, counters that the figures are nothing more than toys to amuse children.

Or take the Sigillaria he just mentioned: the holiday and its clay figurines are meant to amuse infants who haven’t yet learned to walk, but he tries to make it a matter of religious duty.

But also:

47. "Epicadus reports that when Hercules had slain Geryon and led his cattle victoriously through Italy, he built the Sublician bridge (as it’s now called) so that he could cast into the river human effigies equal in number to the companions he had lost to mischance on his journey: that way, they could be carried along by the current to the sea and be restored, in a sense, to their ancestral homes in place of the bodies of the dead. That is why (according to Epicadus) the practice of fashioning such effigies has remained part of the rites."

== The fair ==
For the four-day fair, vendors of the figurines and other gifts set up temporary stalls in the Campus Martius, and later in the portico of the Baths of Trajan. Juvenal says the vendor stalls blocked the paintings of Jason and the Argonauts in the Porticus Agrippiana.
