= Synthesis (clothing) =

Clothing in ancient Rome

The synthesis (Greek for something "put together"), probably synonymous with cenatoria, "dinner clothes" (from Latin cena, "dinner"), was a garment or outfit worn in ancient Rome for dining or special occasions such as the Saturnalia. It seems to have been worn by both men and women, and was particularly a fashion of the mid-1st to early 2nd century AD. More is known about the etiquette of wearing the synthesis than its appearance. It is mentioned mainly by Martial, who also uses the word cenatoria. This attire was characteristically colorful, but lacking further description in ancient literature or a secure identification of the synthesis in art, scholars have viewed it variously as an ensemble or suit, or a single garment that was a sort of robe or tunic-mantle combination.

The synthesis was part of the urbanite's wardrobe, and fashionable Romans might own several. The garment might be conspicuously expensive, and Martial mentions one of his friends giving a fine synthesis to his mistress on the occasion of the Matronalia. Residents of the municipalities would have rare occasion to wear the synthesis.

The toga, the Roman male citizen's characteristic garment, was cumbersome and considered inappropriate for reclining at dinner. At the same time, exposing too much flesh at dinner was offensive to Romans; funerary dining scenes in Roman art showing bare torsos have a symbolic or religious meaning. The synthesis was a colorful alternative for private leisure, and wearing it in everyday public life was a faux pas. It could be worn during the day in public only during the Saturnalia, the December festival during which social norms were turned topsy-turvy. Martial treats the wearing of the synthesis as characteristic of the holiday, as was the wearing of the "cap of freedom" (pilleus). It may originally have been women's clothing, adopted by men as part of the holiday's role reversals. The emperor Nero was criticized for choosing a loose-belted synthesis as everyday attire.

The priesthood of the Arval Brothers wore a white version of the garment at their ceremonial banquets. The officers of the Arvals (magister and flamen) held annual office from one Saturnalia (December 17) to the next.

== See also ==
- Clothing in ancient Rome
