= Lua (goddess) =

Roman goddess

Lua (Latin: Lūa) was a minor goddess in Roman religion, associated with the god Saturn and the burning of enemy weapons. Little is known about her; there are no surviving images depicting her, nor any archaeological evidence of temples, rituals, or cults.

== Name ==
The exact origins of Lua's name are not known. It may be connected to the Greek verb luō meaning "to release" or "to atone;" the Latin verb luere: "to suffer," or "to make amends for;" or the Latin lues, meaning "plague."

== Functions ==
The Roman historian Livy mentioned Lua twice in his Ab Urbe Condita. After the Volscians were defeated by the Romans in battle, they fled the area, leaving behind their dead and a large amount of weapons. The Roman consul had his troops gather the Volscians' weapons, and he offered them to Lua Mater ("Mother Lua"). Later in the text, Livy wrote that, after an enemy's weapons were collected, they had to be burned as an offering to Mars, Minerva, and Lua Mater. The use of the epithet Mater for female deities was common, and does not necessarily mean that Lua was conceived of as a mother goddess.

The goddess was also called Lua Saturni ("Lua of Saturn"). Both Varro and Gellius directly associated her with Saturn, with Gellius comparing their relationship to those of Salacia and Neptune and Maia and Vulcan. In this context, Lua Saturni embodied a characteristic or function of Saturn, but scholars are not in agreement over what this function was. It has been hypothesized that she may have embodied Saturn's ability to cause reproductive sterility, his destructive capabilities, or his association with seed germination. Using the potentially related Greek verb luō ("to release"), Dutch classicist H.S. Versnel proposes that Lua Saturni "freed" the grain supply that Saturn had stowed under the earth, opening it for human use.
