= Hybristica =

Women's festival in ancient Argos

Hybristica was a solemn feast among the Greeks of ancient Argos, with sacrifices and other ceremonies, in which either sex appeared in the dress of the other to do honor to Aphrodite in quality of a god, a goddess, or both.

== Overview ==
The Hybristica was celebrated at Argos upon the new moon of the month of Hermeas. During the festival, women would dress like men and demean their husbands; insulting them and treating them with every mark of inferiority. The feastival was in memory of the Argian defence of their country made by the females under the conduct of Telesilla, against Cleomenes I and Demaratus at the head of the Spartan army.

Plutarch observes that the word hybristica signifies infamy, and adds that it well became the occasion, the women strutting in cloaks, while the men dangled in petticoats.
