= Feriae Latinae =

Annual religious festival in ancient Rome

Latin Festival Feriae Latinae
- Observed by: Roman Republic, Roman Empire
- Type: Classical Roman religion
- Celebrations: communal meal; hanging of oscilla
- Observances: general truce; offering of pastoral products; libation of milk; pure white heifer sacrificed
- Date: moveable feast (feriae conceptivae) in April
- Related to: the Latin League and the pre-urban pastoral Latini

The Feriae Latinae or Latin Festival was an ancient Roman religious festival held in April on the Alban Mount. The date varied, and was determined and announced by the consuls each year when they took office. It was one of the most ancient festivals celebrated by the Roman state and is supposed to have predated the founding of Rome — in historical terms, to have dated to a pre-urban pastoral age. It continued to be held into the 3rd century AD, and perhaps later.

The rite was a reaffirmation of the alliance among members of the Latin League, and a truce was honored throughout the festival. Each Latin city sent a representative and offerings such as sheep, cheese, or other pastoral products. The presiding Roman consul offered a libation of milk, and conducted the sacrifice of a pure white heifer that had never been yoked. The flesh was consumed as part of a communal meal as a sacrament. As part of the festivities, the figurines called oscilla were hung from trees.

The consuls were required to attend, leaving a praefectus urbi in charge of the city. If the consuls had to be absent (if, for instance, they were waging war), a dictator was appointed to oversee the festival. Consuls were not supposed to depart for their provinces until after the festival.
