= Oscilla =

For the genus of marine molluscs, see Oscilla (gastropod).

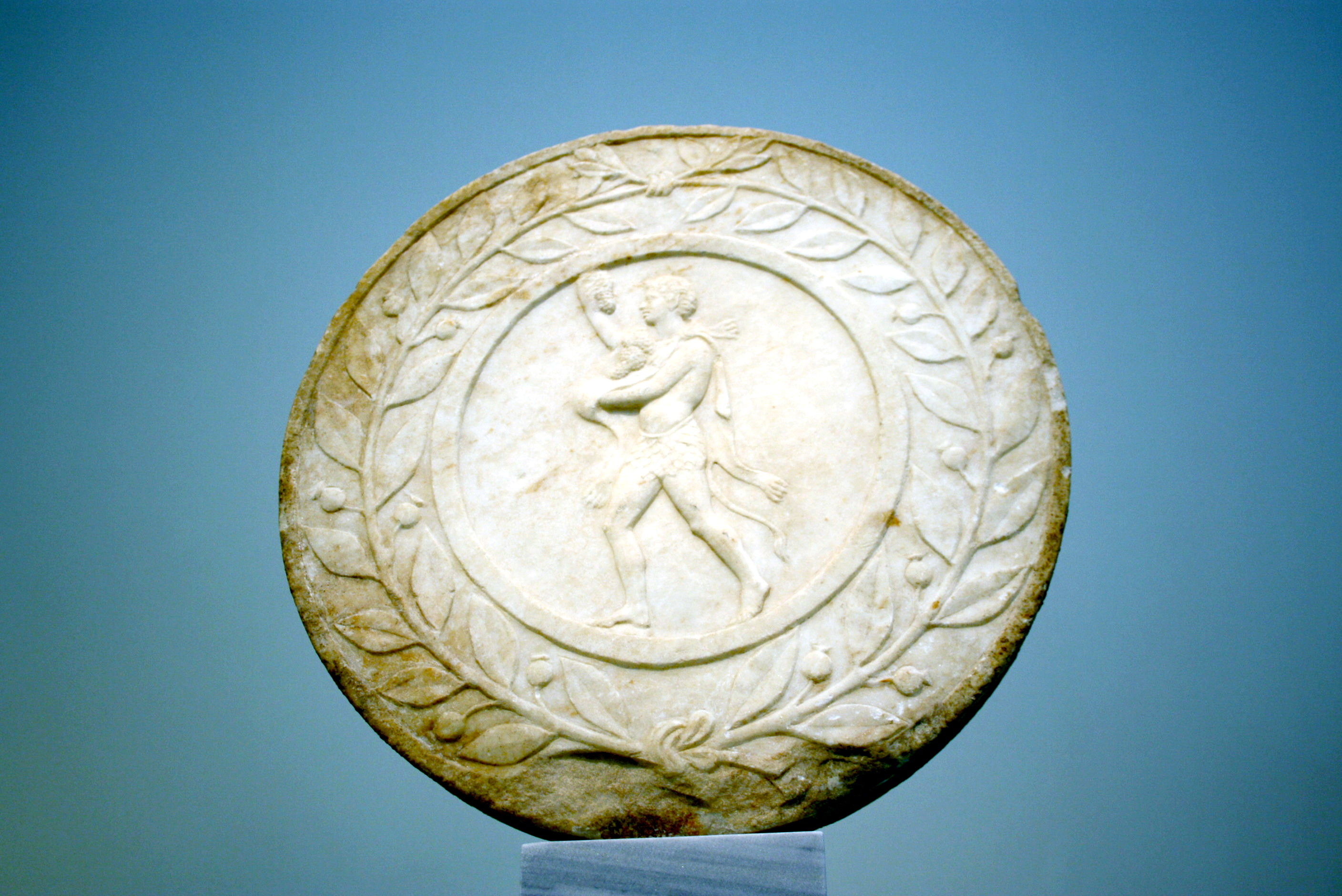
Oscillum in Athens

Oscilla is a word applied in Latin usage to small figures, most commonly masks or faces, which were hung up as offerings to various deities, either for propitiation or expiation, and in connection with festivals and other ceremonies. It is usually taken as the plural of oscillum (diminutive of os), a little face. As the oscilla swung in the wind, oscillare came to mean to swing, hence in English oscillation, the act of swinging backwards and forwards, periodic motion to and fro, hence any variation or fluctuation, actual or figurative.

Many oscilla or masks, representing the head of Bacchus or of different rustic deities, are still preserved. There is a marble oscillum of Bacchus in the British Museum. Others still in existence are made of earthenware, but it seems probable that wax and wood were the ordinary materials. Small rudely shaped figures of wool, known as pilae, were also hung up in the same way as the oscilla.

The festivals at which the hanging of oscilla took place were:

- The Sementivae Feriae, or sowing festivals, and the Paganalia, the country festivals of the tutelary deities of the pagi; both took place in January. Here the oscilla were hung on trees, such as the vine and the olive, oak and the pine, and represented the faces of Liber, Bacchus or other deity connected with the cultivation of the soil (Virgil, Georgics ii.382-396).
- The Feriae Latinae; in this case games were played, among them swinging (oscillatio); cf. the Greek festival of Aeora (see Erigone). Festus (s.v. Oscillum, ed. Muller, p. 194) says that this swinging was called oscillatio because the swingers masked their faces (os celare) out of shame.
- At the Compitalia, Festus says (Paulus ex Fest., ed. Muller, p. 239) that pilae and effigies viriles et muliebres made of wool were hung at the crossroads to the Lares, the number of pilae equalling that of the slaves of the family, the effigies that of the children; the purpose being to induce the Lares to spare the living, and to be content with the pilae and images. This has led to the generally accepted conclusion that the custom of hanging these oscilla represents an older practice of expiating human sacrifice. There is also no doubt a connection with the lustratio in that both rely on purification by the air.
