= List of Roman deities =

The Roman deities most widely known today are those the Romans identified with Greek counterparts, integrating Greek myths, iconography, and sometimes religious practices into Roman culture, including Latin literature, Roman art, and religious life as it was experienced throughout the Roman Empire. Many of the Romans' own gods remain obscure, known only by name and sometimes function, through inscriptions and texts that are often fragmentary. This is particularly true of those gods belonging to the archaic religion of the Romans dating back to the era of kings, the so-called "religion of Numa", which was perpetuated or revived over the centuries. Some archaic deities have Italic or Etruscan counterparts, as identified both by ancient sources and by modern scholars. Throughout the Empire, the deities of peoples in the provinces were given new theological interpretations in light of functions or attributes they shared with Roman deities.

A survey of theological groups as constructed by the Romans themselves is followed by an extensive alphabetical list concluding with examples of common epithets shared by multiple divinities.

== Collectives ==
Even in invocations, which generally required precise naming, the Romans sometimes spoke of gods as groups or collectives rather than naming them as individuals. Some groups, such as the Camenae and Parcae, were thought of as a limited number of individual deities, even though the number of these might not be given consistently in all periods and all texts. Others are numberless collectives.

=== Spatial tripartition ===
Varro grouped the gods broadly into three divisions of heaven, earth, and underworld:

- di superi, the gods above or heavenly gods, whose altars were designated as altaria.
- di terrestres, "terrestrial gods," whose altars were designated as arae.
- di inferi, the gods below, that is, the gods of the underworld, infernal or chthonic gods, whose altars were foci, fire pits or specially constructed hearths.

More common is a dualistic contrast between superi and inferi.

=== Triads ===
- Archaic Triad: Jupiter, Mars, Quirinus.
- Capitoline Triad: Jupiter, Juno, Minerva.
- Plebeian or Aventine Triad: Ceres, Liber, Libera, dating to 493 BC.

=== Groupings of twelve ===
==== Lectisternium of 217 BC ====
A lectisternium is a banquet for the gods, at which they appear as images seated on couches, as if present and participating. In describing the lectisternium of the Twelve Great gods in 217 BC, the Augustan historian Livy places the deities in gender-balanced pairs:

- Jupiter–Juno
- Neptune–Minerva
- Mars–Venus
- Apollo–Diana
- Vulcan–Vesta
- Mercury–Ceres

Divine male-female complements such as these, as well as the anthropomorphic influence of Greek mythology, contributed to a tendency in Latin literature to represent the gods as "married" couples or (as in the case of Venus and Mars) lovers.

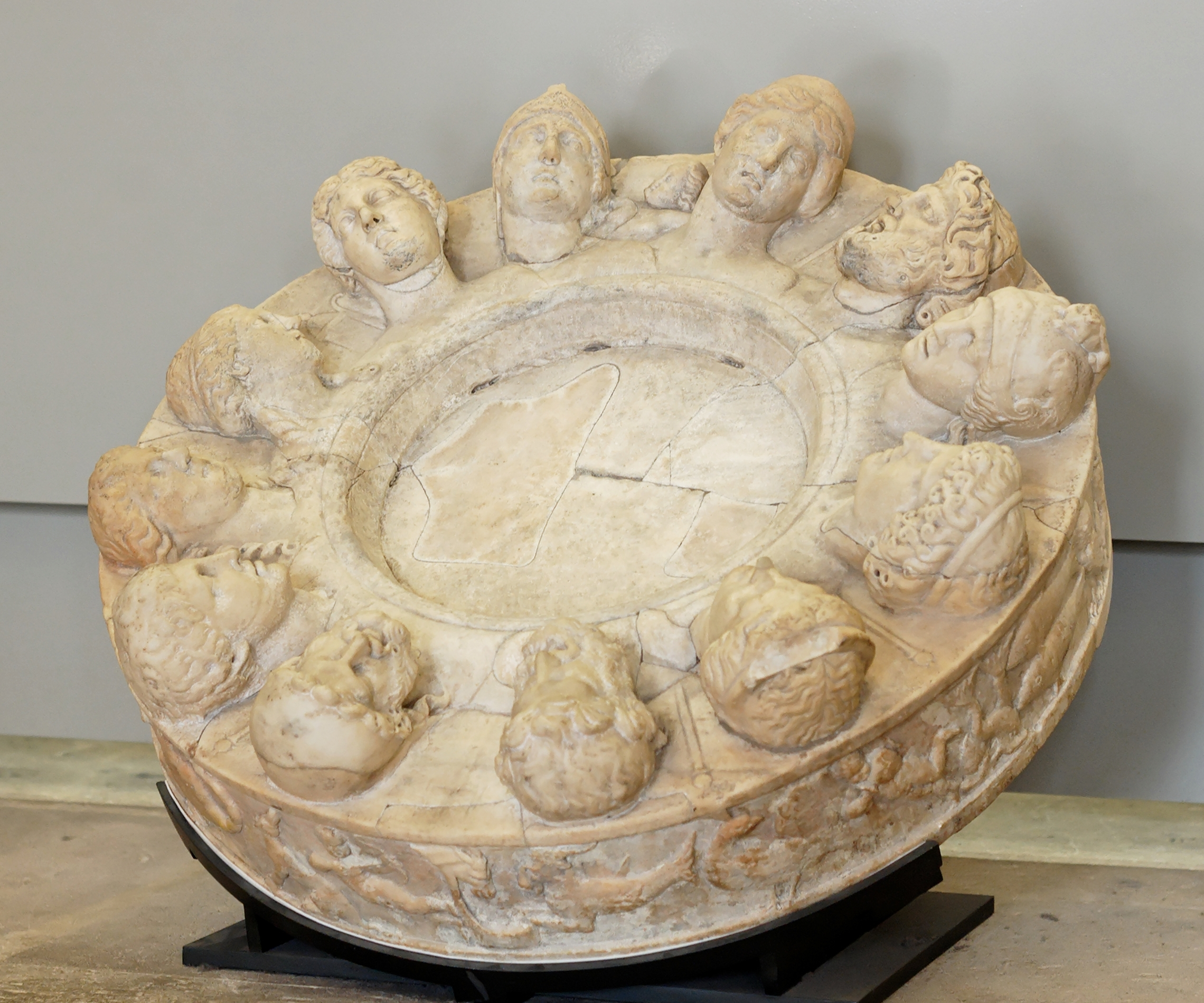
Di Consentes on an altar

==== Dii Consentes ====
Varro uses the name Dii Consentes for twelve deities whose gilded images stood in the forum. These were also placed in six male-female pairs. Although individual names are not listed, they are assumed to be the deities of the lectisternium. A fragment from Ennius, within whose lifetime the lectisternium occurred, lists the same twelve deities by name, though in a different order from that of Livy: Juno, Vesta, Minerva, Ceres, Diana, Venus, Mars, Mercurius, Jove, Neptunus, Vulcanus, Apollo.

The Dii Consentes are sometimes seen as the Roman equivalent of the Greek Olympians. The meaning of Consentes is subject to interpretation, but is usually taken to mean that they form a council or consensus of deities.

=== Di Flaminales ===
The three deities cultivated by the major flamens were:

- Jupiter
- Mars
- Quirinus

The twelve deities attended by the minor flamens were:

- Carmentis
- Ceres
- Falacer
- Flora
- Furrina
- Palatua
- Pomona
- Portunus
- Vulcan
- Volturnus
- two other deities whose names are not known

=== Di selecti ===
Varro gives a list of twenty principal gods of Roman religion:

- Janus
- Jupiter
- Saturn
- Genius
- Mercury
- Apollo
- Mars
- Vulcan
- Neptune
- Sol
- Orcus
- Liber
- Tellus
- Ceres
- Juno
- Luna
- Diana
- Minerva
- Venus
- Vesta

=== Italic gods ===
- Adranus
- Palici

==== Sabine gods ====
Varro, who was himself of Sabine origin, gives a list of Sabine gods who were adopted by the Romans:

- Feronia
- Minerva
- Novensides (Note: Or Novensiles: the spelling -d- for -l- is characteristic of the Sabine language.)
- Pales
- Salus
- Fortuna
- Fons
- Fides (Note: For Fides, see also Semo Sancus or Dius Fidius.)
- Ops
- Flora
- Vediovis
- Saturn
- Sol
- Luna
- Vulcan
- Summanus
- Larunda
- Terminus
- Quirinus
- Vortumnus
- Lares
- Diana
- Lucina

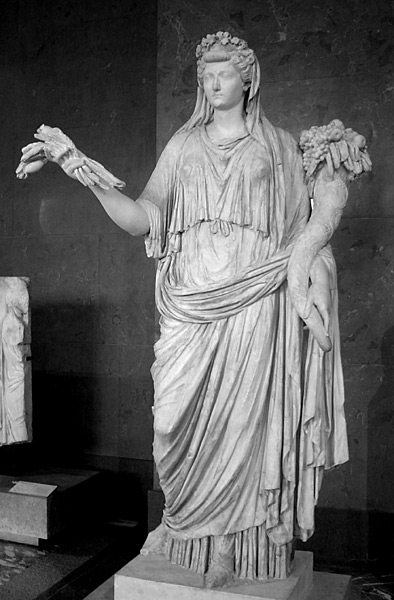
Livia, wife of Augustus, dressed as the goddess Ops

Elsewhere, Varro claims Sol Indiges – who had a sacred grove at Lavinium – as Sabine but at the same time equates him with Apollo. Of those listed, he writes, "several names have their roots in both languages, as trees that grow on a property line creep into both fields. Saturn, for instance, can be said to have another origin here, and so too Diana." (Note: Latin: e quis nonnulla nomina in utraque lingua habent radices, ut arbores quae in confinio natae in utroque agro serpunt: potest enim Saturnus hic de alia causa esse dictus atque in Sabinis, et sic Diana.)

Varro makes various claims for Sabine origins throughout his works, some more plausible than others, and his list should not be taken at face value. But the importance of the Sabines in the early cultural formation of Rome is evidenced, for instance, by the bride abduction of the Sabine women by Romulus's men, and in the Sabine ethnicity of Numa Pompilius, second king of Rome, to whom are attributed many of Rome's religious and legal institutions. Varro says that the altars to most of these gods were established at Rome by King Tatius as the result of a vow (votum). (Note: Tatius is said by Varro to have dedicated altars to "Ops, Flora, Vediovis, and Saturn; to Sol, Luna, Vulcan, and Summanus; and likewise to Larunda, Terminus, Quirinus, Vortumnus, the Lares, Diana, and Lucina.")

=== Indigitamenta ===
The indigitamenta are deities known only or primarily as a name; they may be minor entities, or epithets of major gods. Lists of deities were kept by the College of Pontiffs to assure that the correct names were invoked for public prayers. The books of the Pontiffs are lost, known only through scattered passages in Latin literature. The most extensive lists are provided by the Church Fathers who sought systematically to debunk Roman religion while drawing on the theological works of Varro, also surviving only in quoted or referenced fragments. W.H. Roscher collated the standard modern list of indigitamenta, though other scholars may differ with him on some points.

=== Di indigetes and novensiles ===
The di indigetes were thought by Georg Wissowa to be Rome's indigenous deities, in contrast to the di novensides or novensiles, "newcomer gods". No ancient source, however, poses this dichotomy, which is not generally accepted among scholars of the 21st century. The meaning of the epithet indiges (singular) has no scholarly consensus, and noven may mean "nine" (novem) rather than "new".

== Alphabetical list ==
=== A ===
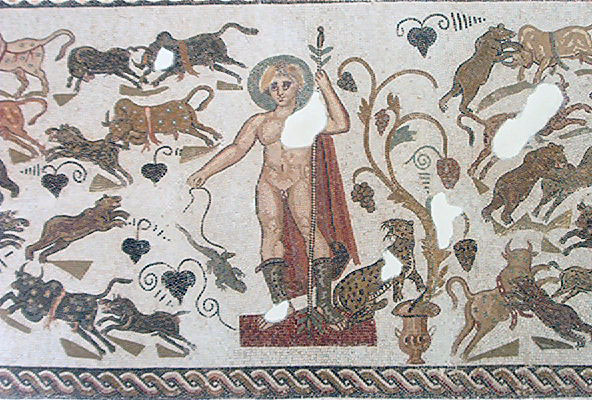
A "lizard-slayer" Apollo on a mosaic from Roman Africa

- Abundantia, divine personification of abundance and prosperity.
- Acca Larentia, a diva of complex meaning and origin in whose honor the Larentalia was held.
- Acis, god of the Acis River in Sicily.
- Aerecura, goddess possibly of Celtic origin, associated with the underworld and identified with Proserpina.
- Aequitas, divine personification of fairness.
- Aesculapius, the Roman equivalent of Asclepius, god of health and medicine.
- Aeternitas, goddess and personification of eternity.
- Agenoria, goddess and personification of activity.
- Aion (Latin spelling Aeon), Hellenistic god of cyclical or unbounded time, related to the concepts of aevum or saeculum
- Aius Locutius, divine voice that warned the Romans of the imminent Gallic invasion.
- Alernus or Elernus (possibly Helernus), an archaic god whose sacred grove (lucus) was near the Tiber river. He is named definitively only by Ovid. The grove was the birthplace of the nymph Cardea, and despite the obscurity of the god, the state priests still carried out sacred rites (sacra) there in the time of Augustus. Alernus may have been a chthonic god, if a black ox was the correct sacrificial offering to him, since dark victims were offered to underworld gods. Dumézil wanted to make him a god of beans.
- Angerona, goddess who relieved people from pain and sorrow.
- Angitia, goddess associated with snakes and Medea.
- Anna Perenna, early goddess of the "circle of the year", her festival was celebrated March 15.
- Annona, the divine personification of the grain supply to the city of Rome.
- Antevorta, goddess of the future and one of the Camenae; also called Porrima.
- Apollo, god of poetry, music, and oracles. Twin brother of Diana and one of the Dii Consentes.
- Arimanius, an obscure Mithraic god.
- Aura, often plural Aurae, "the Breezes".
- Aurora, goddess of the dawn.
- Averruncus, a god propitiated to avert calamity.

=== B ===
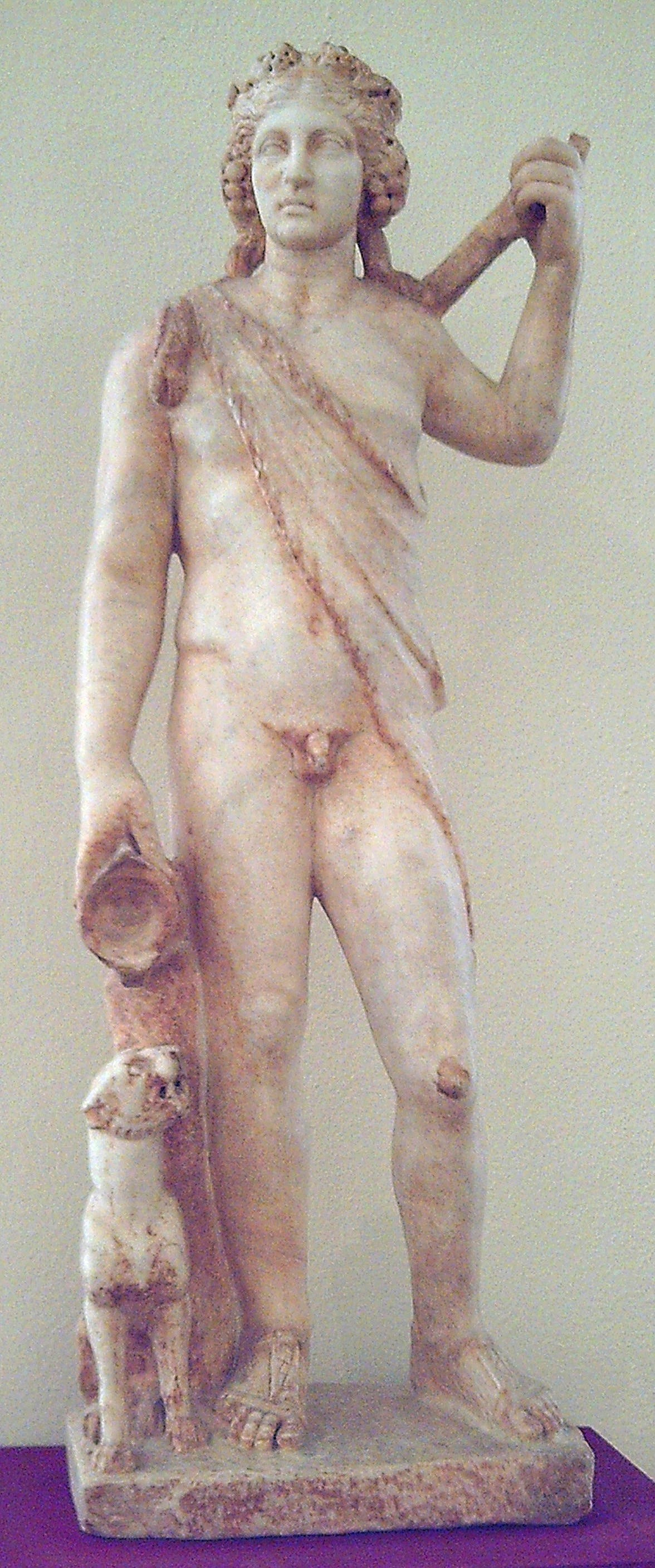
A Bacchus from Roman Spain, 2nd century

- Bacchus, god of wine, sensual pleasures, and truth, originally a cult title for the Greek Dionysus and identified with the Roman Liber.
- Bellona or Duellona, war goddess.
- Bona Dea, the "women's goddess" with functions pertaining to fertility, healing, and chastity.
- Bonus Eventus, divine personification of "Good Outcome".
- Bubona, goddess of cattle.

=== C ===
- Caca, an archaic fire goddess and "proto-Vesta"; the sister of Cacus.
- Cacus, originally an ancient god of fire, later regarded as a giant.
- Caelus, god of the sky before Jupiter.
- Camenae, goddesses with various attributes including fresh water, prophecy, and childbirth. There were four of them: Carmenta, Egeria, Antevorta, and Postvorta.
- Cardea, goddess of the hinge (cardo), identified by Ovid with Carna (below)
- Carmenta, goddess of childbirth and prophecy, and assigned a flamen minor. The leader of the Camenae.
- Carmentes, two goddesses of childbirth: Antevorta and Postvorta or Porrima, future and past.
- Carna, goddess who preserved the health of the heart and other internal organs.
- Ceres, goddess of the harvest and mother of Proserpina, and one of the Dii Consentes. The Roman equivalent of Demeter (Greek goddess).
- Clementia, goddess of forgiveness and mercy.
- Cloacina, goddess who presided over the system of sewers in Rome; identified with Venus.
- Concordia, goddess of agreement, understanding, and marital harmony.
- Consus, chthonic god protecting grain storage.
- Cupid, Roman god of love. The son of Venus, and equivalent to Greek Eros.
- Cura, personification of care and concern who according to a single source created humans from clay.
- Cybele, an imported tutelary goddess often identified with Magna Mater.

=== D ===
- Dea Dia, goddess of growth.
- Dea Tacita ("The Silent Goddess"), a goddess of the dead; later equated with the earth goddess Larenta.
- Dea Tertiana and Dea Quartana, the sister goddesses of tertian and quartan fevers. Presumably daughters or sisters of Dea Febris.
- Decima, minor goddess and one of the Parcae (Roman equivalent of the Moirai). The measurer of the thread of life, her Greek equivalent was Lachesis.

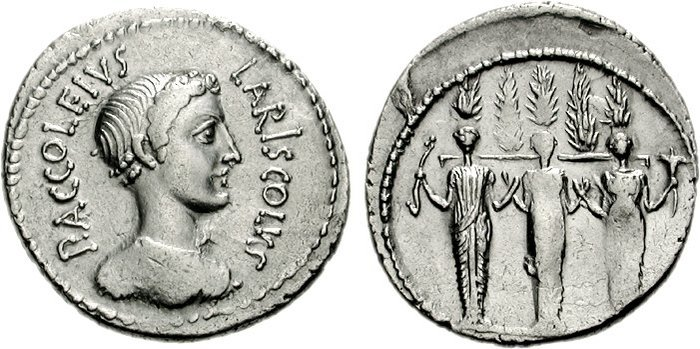
Diana Nemorensis on a denarius

- Devera or Deverra, goddess who ruled over the brooms used to purify temples in preparation for various worship services, sacrifices and celebrations; she protected midwives and women in labor.
- Diana, goddess of the hunt, the moon, virginity, and childbirth, twin sister of Apollo and one of the Dii Consentes.
- Diana Nemorensis, local version of Diana. The Roman equivalent of Artemis.
- Discordia, personification of discord and strife. The Roman equivalent of Eris.
- Dius Fidius, god of oaths, associated with Jupiter.
- Di inferi, deities associated with death and the underworld.
- Disciplina, personification of discipline.
- Dis Pater or Dispater, god of wealth and the underworld; perhaps a translation of Greek Plouton (Pluto).

=== E ===
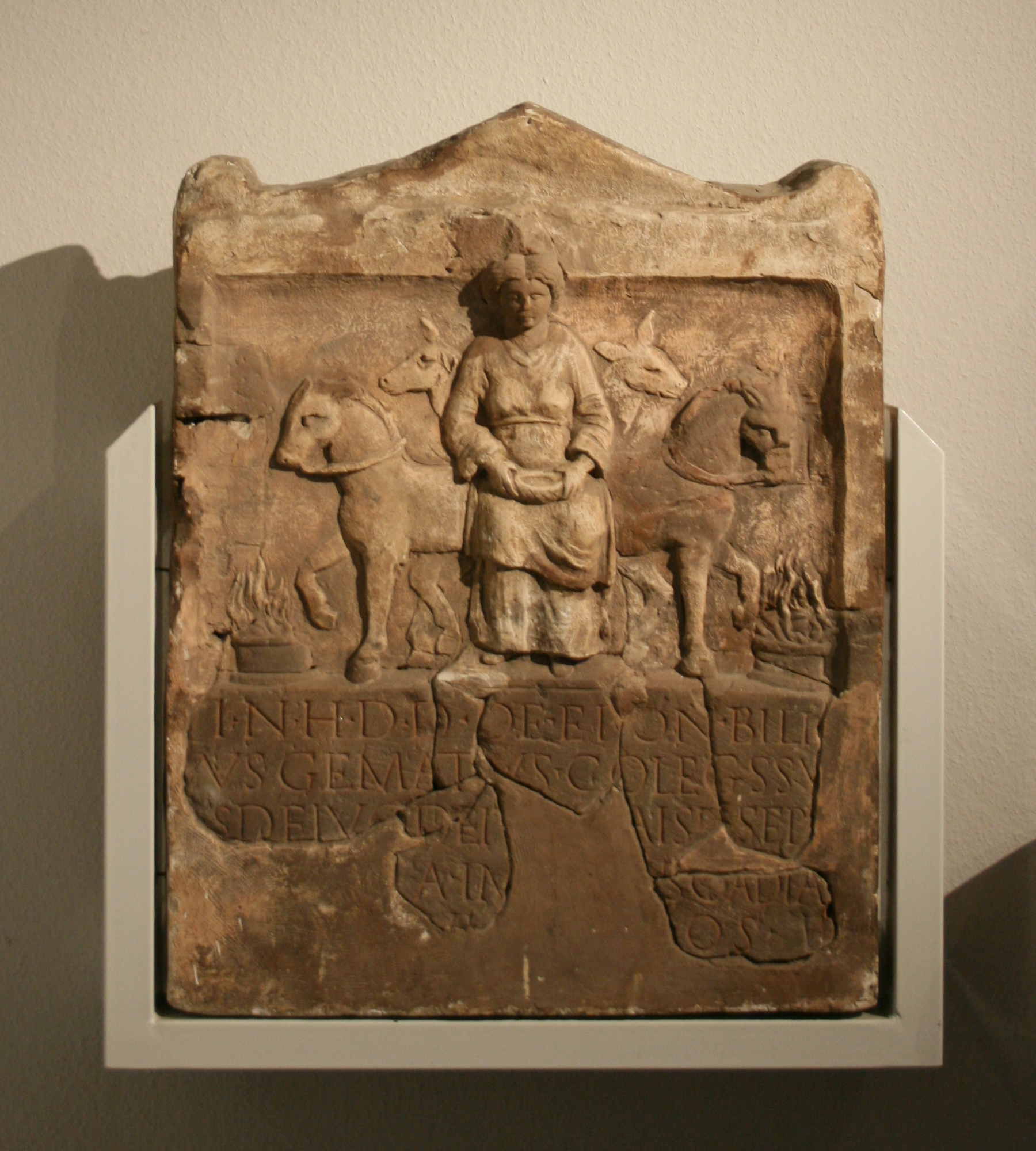
The Gallo-Roman horse goddess Epona

- Egeria, water nymph or goddess, later considered one of the Camenae.
- Empanda or Panda, a goddess whose temple never closed to those in need.
- Epona, Gallo-Roman goddess of horses and horsemanship, usually assumed to be of Celtic origin.

=== F ===
- Falacer, obscure god. He was assigned a minor flamen.
- Fama, goddess of fame and rumor.
- Fascinus, phallic god who protected from invidia (envy) and the evil eye.
- Fauna, goddess of prophecy, but perhaps a title of other goddesses such as Maia.
- Faunus, god of flocks.
- Faustitas, goddess who protected herd and livestock.
- Febris, goddess of fevers, with the power to cause or prevent fevers and malaria. Accompanied by Dea Tertiana and Dea Quartiana.
- Februus, god of Etruscan origin for whom the month of February was named; concerned with purification
- Fecunditas, personification of fertility.
- Felicitas, personification of good luck and success.
- Ferentina, patron goddess of the city Ferentinum, Latium, protector of the Latin commonwealth.
- Feronia, goddess concerned with wilderness, plebeians, freedmen, and liberty in a general sense. She was also an Underworld goddess.
- Fides, personification of loyalty.
- Flora, goddess of flowers, was assigned a flamen minor.
- Fornax, goddess probably conceived of to explain the Fornacalia, "Oven Festival."
- Fontus or Fons, god of wells and springs.
- Fortuna, goddess of fortune.
- Fulgora, personification of lightning.
- Furrina, goddess whose functions are mostly unknown, but in archaic times important enough to be assigned a flamen.

=== G ===
- Genius, the tutelary spirit or divinity of each individual
- Gratiae, Roman term for the Charites or Graces.

=== H ===
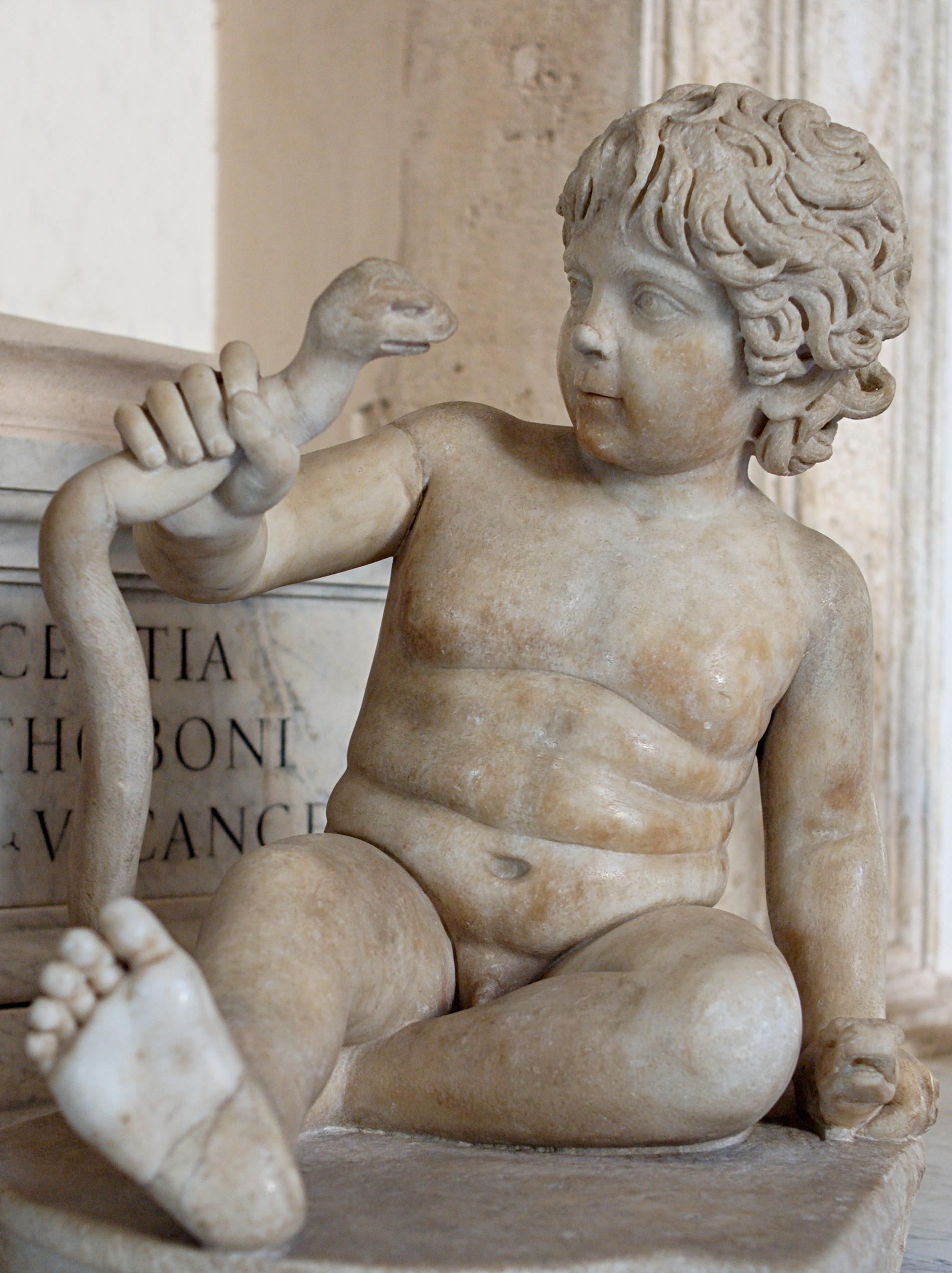
Roman statue of the infant Hercules strangling a snake

- Hercules, god of strength, whose worship was derived from the Greek hero Heracles but took on a distinctly Roman character.
- Hermaphroditus, an androgynous Greek god whose mythology was imported into Latin literature.
- Honos, a divine personification of honor.
- Hora, the wife of Quirinus.

=== I ===
- Indiges, the deified Aeneas.
- Intercidona, minor goddess of childbirth; invoked to keep evil spirits away from the child; symbolised by a cleaver.
- Inuus, god of fertility and sexual intercourse, protector of livestock.
- Invidia, goddess of envy and wrongdoing.

=== J ===
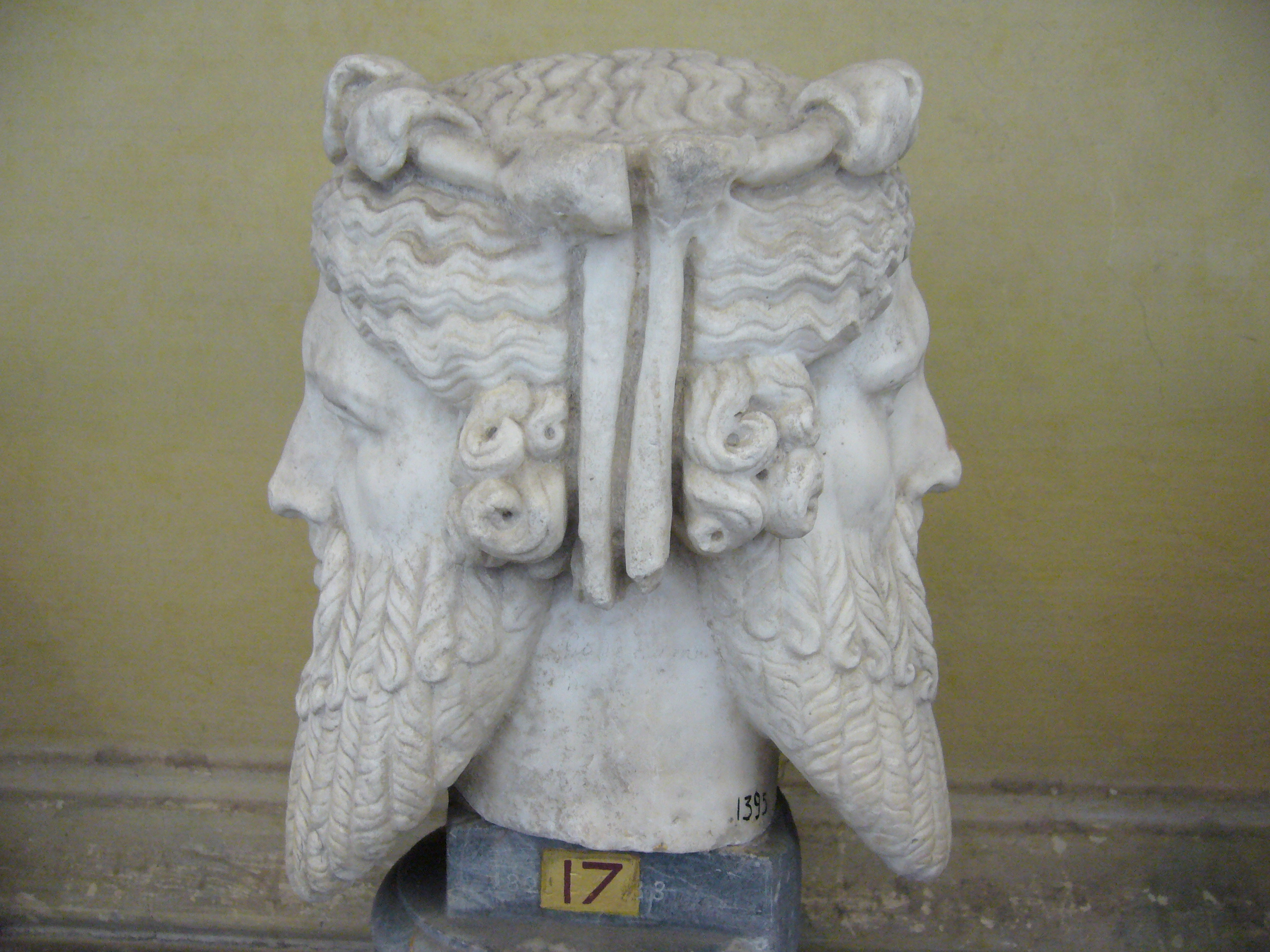
A janiform sculpture, perhaps of Janus

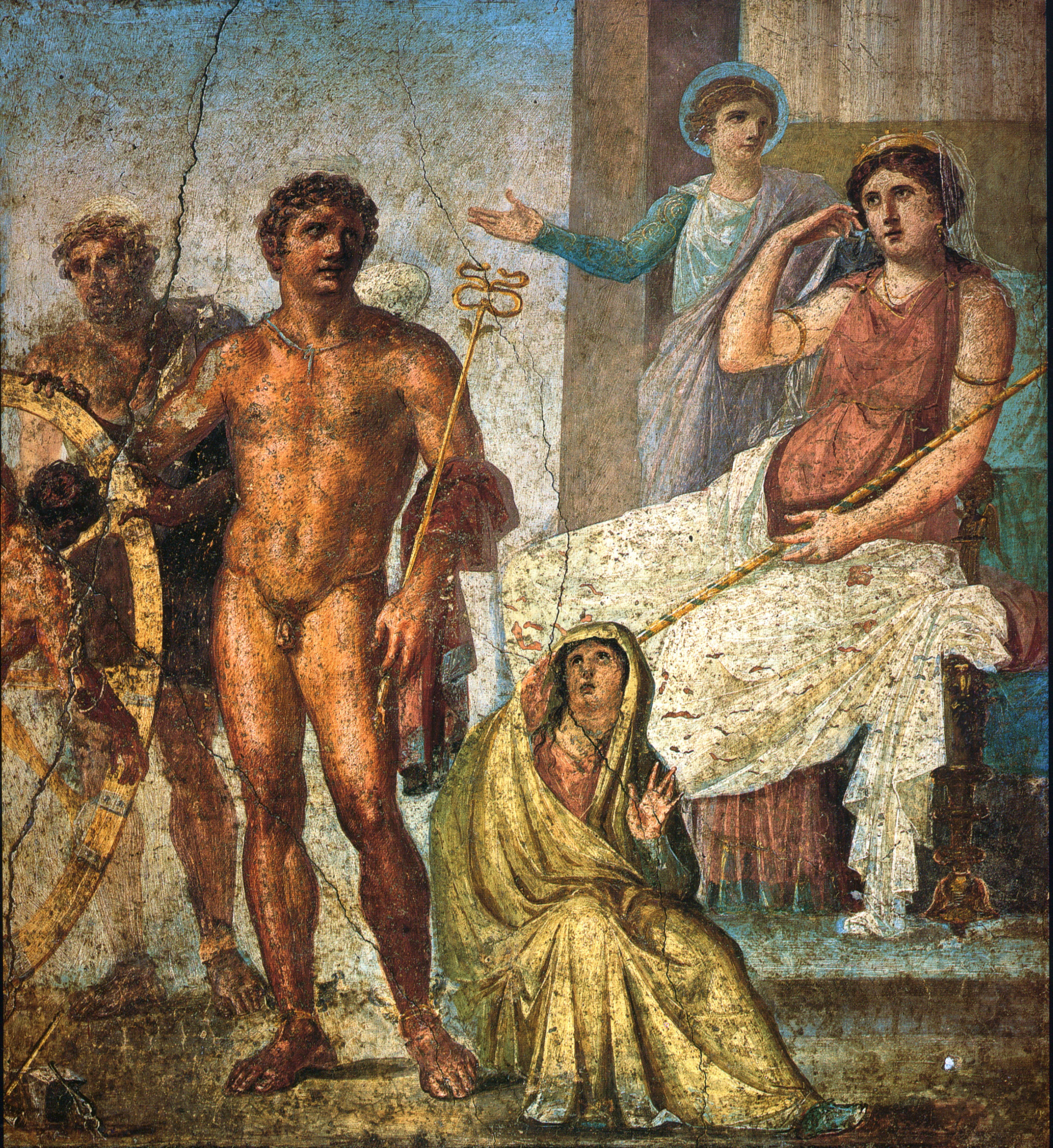
Punishment of Ixion: in the center is Mercury holding the caduceus and on the right Juno sits on her throne. Behind her Iris stands and gestures. On the left is Vulcan (blond figure) standing behind the wheel, manning it, with Ixion already tied to it. Nephele sits at Mercury's feet; a Roman fresco from the eastern wall of the triclinium in the House of the Vettii, Pompeii, Fourth Style (60–79 AD).

- Janus, double-faced or two-headed god of beginnings and endings and of doors.
- Juno, Queen of the gods, goddess of matrimony, and one of the Dii Consentes. Equivalent to Greek Hera.
- Jupiter, King of the gods, god of storms, lightning, sky, and one of the Dii Consentes; was assigned a flamen maior. Equivalent to Greek Zeus.
- Justitia, goddess of justice.
- Juturna, goddess of fountains, wells, and springs.
- Juventas, goddess of youth.

=== L ===
- Lares, household gods.
- Latona, goddess of light.
- Laverna, patroness of thieves, con men and charlatans.
- Lemures, the malevolent dead.
- Levana, goddess of the rite through which fathers accepted newborn babies as their own.
- Letum, personification of death.
- Liber, a god of male fertility, viniculture and freedom, assimilated to Roman Bacchus and Greek Dionysus.
- Libera, Liber's female equivalent, assimilated to Roman Proserpina and Greek Persephone.
- Liberalitas, goddess or personification of generosity.
- Libertas, goddess or personification of freedom.
- Libitina, goddess of death, corpses and funerals.
- Lua, goddess to whom soldiers sacrificed captured weapons, probably a consort of Saturn.
- Lucina, goddess of childbirth, but often as an aspect of Juno.
- Luna, goddess of the moon.
- Lupercus, god of shepherds and wolves; as the god of the Lupercalia, his identity is obscure, but he is sometimes identified with the Greek god Pan.
- Lympha, often plural lymphae, a water deity assimilated to the Greek nymphs.

=== M ===
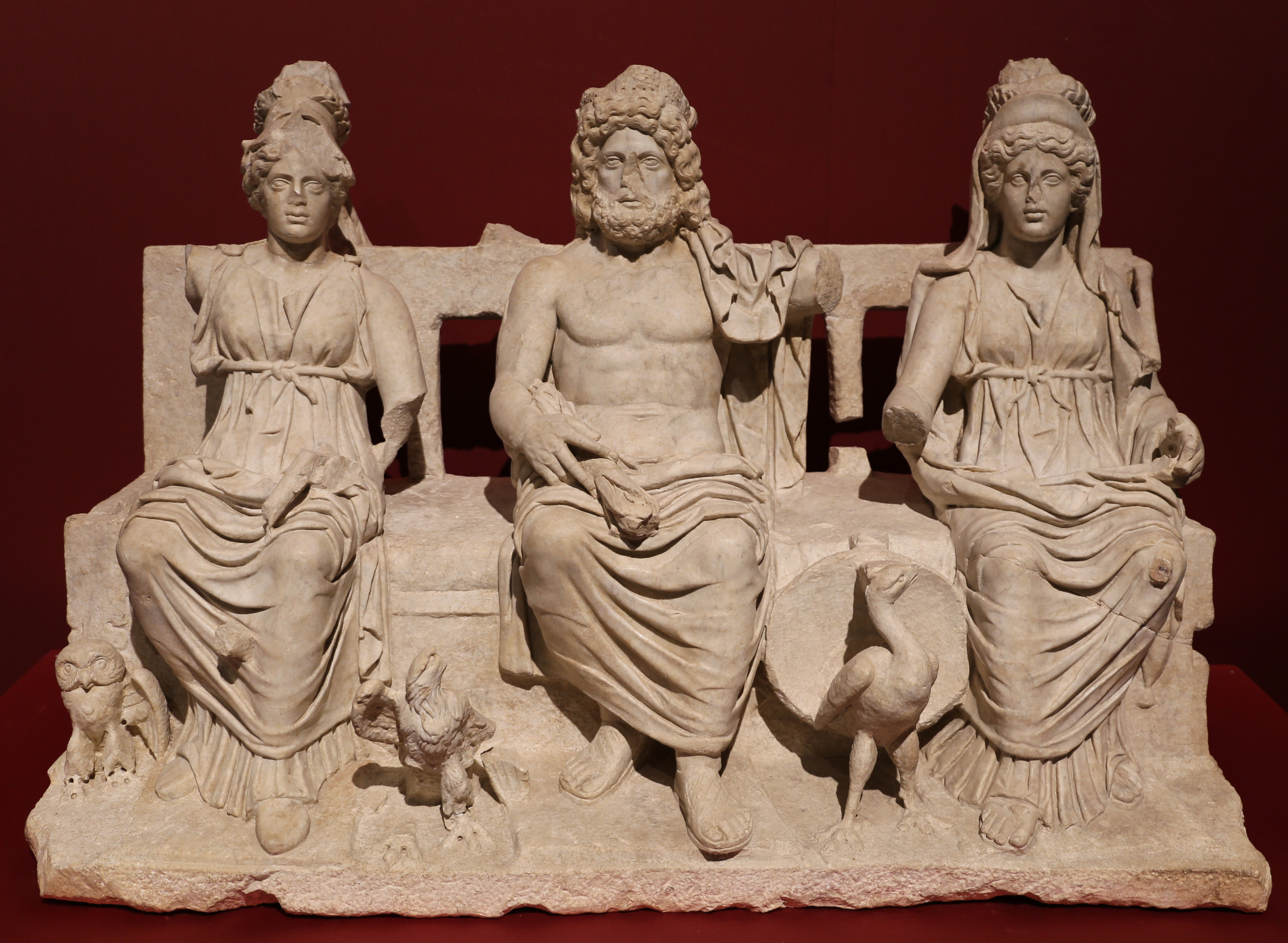
Capitoline Triad of Juno, Jupiter, and Minerva

- Mana Genita, goddess of infant mortality
- Manes, the souls of the dead who came to be seen as household deities.
- Mania, the consort of the Etruscan underworld god Mantus, and perhaps to be identified with the tenebrous Mater Larum; not to be confused with the Greek Maniae.
- Mantus, an Etruscan god of the dead and ruler of the underworld.
- Mars, god of war and father of Romulus, the founder of Rome; one of the Archaic Triad assigned a flamen maior; lover of Venus; one of the Dii Consentes. Greek equivalent is Ares.
- Mater Matuta, goddess of dawn and childbirth, patroness of mariners.
- Meditrina, goddess of healing, introduced to account for the festival of Meditrinalia.
- Mefitis or Mephitis, goddess and personification of poisonous gases and volcanic vapours.
- Mellona or Mellonia, goddess of bees and bee-keeping.
- Mena or Mene, goddess of fertility and menstruation.
- Mercury, messenger of the gods and bearer of souls to the underworld, and one of the Dii Consentes. Roman counterpart of the Greek god Hermes.
- Minerva, goddess of wisdom, war, the arts, industries and trades, and one of the Dii Consentes. Roman equivalent of the Greek goddess Athena.
- Mithras, god worshipped in the Roman empire; popular with soldiers.
- Molae, daughters of Mars, probably goddesses of grinding of the grain.
- Moneta, minor goddess of memory, equivalent to the Greek Mnemosyne. Also used as an epithet of Juno.
- Mors, personification of death and equivalent of the Greek Thanatos.
- Morta, minor goddess of death and one of the Parcae (Roman equivalent of the Moirai). The cutter of the thread of life, her Greek equivalent was Atropos.
- Murcia or Murtia, a little-known goddess who was associated with the myrtle, and in other sources was called a goddess of sloth and laziness (both interpretations arising from false etymologies of her name). Later equated with Venus in the form of Venus Murcia.
- Mutunus Tutunus, a phallic god.

=== N ===
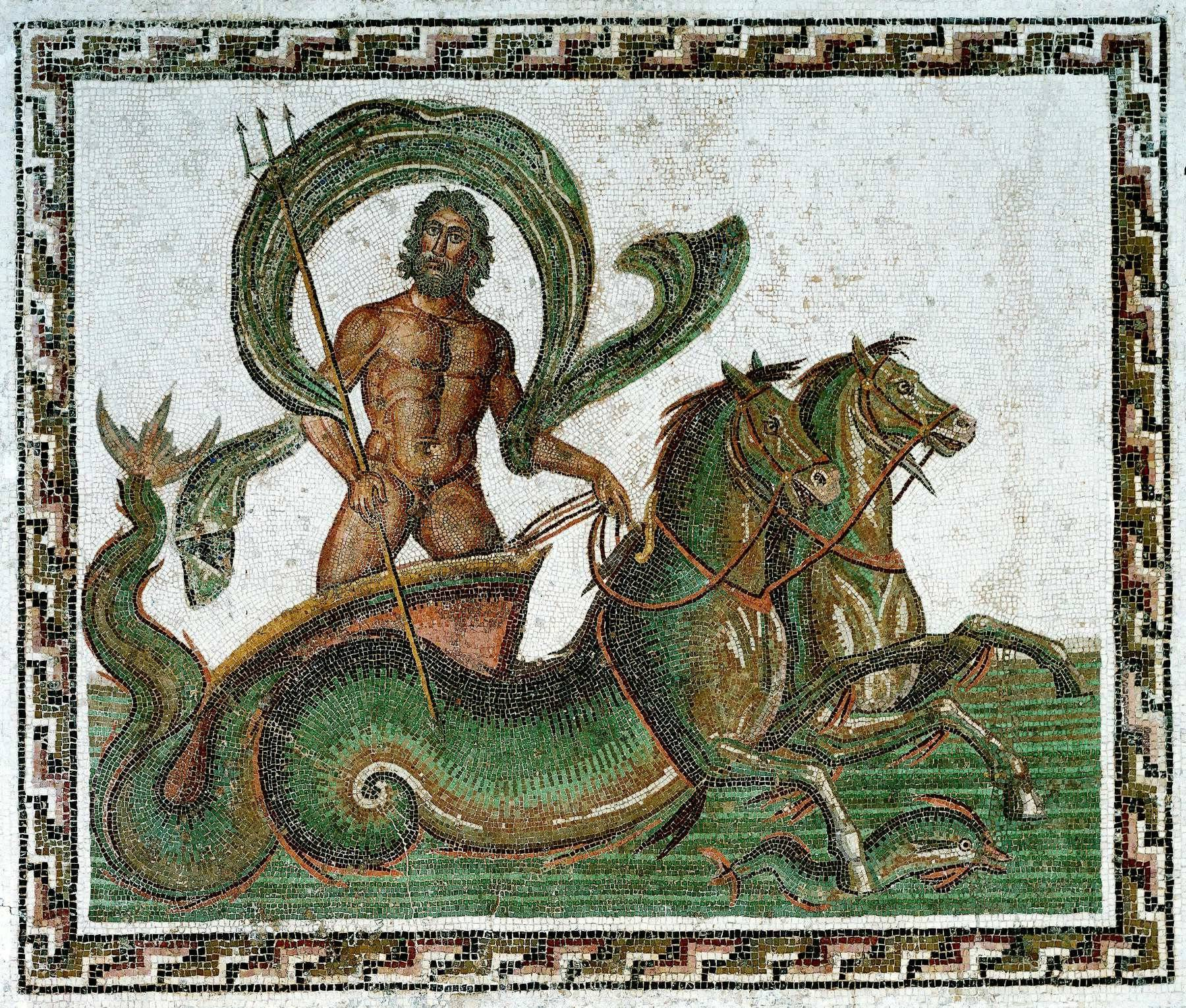
Neptune velificans on a 3rd-century mosaic

- Naenia, goddess of funerary lament.
- Nascio, personification of the act of birth.
- Necessitas, goddess of destiny, the Roman equivalent of Ananke.
- Nemesis, goddess of revenge (Greek), adopted as an Imperial deity of retribution.
- Neptune, god of the sea, earthquakes, and horses, and one of the Dii Consentes. Greek equivalent is Poseidon.
- Nerio, ancient war goddess and the personification of valor. The consort of Mars.
- Neverita, presumed a goddess, and associated with Consus and Neptune in the Etrusco-Roman zodiac of Martianus Capella but otherwise unknown.
- Nixi, also di nixi, dii nixi, or Nixae, goddesses of childbirth.
- Nona, minor goddess, one of the Parcae (Roman equivalent of the Moirai). The spinner of the thread of life, her Greek equivalent was Clotho.
- Nortia a Roman-adopted Etruscan goddess of fate, destiny, and chance from the city of Volsinii, where a nail was driven into a wall of her temple as part a new-year ceremony.
- Nox, goddess of night, derived from the Greek Nyx.

=== O ===
- Ops or Opis, goddess of resources or plenty.
- Orcus, a god of the underworld and punisher of broken oaths.

=== P ===
- Palatua, obscure goddess who guarded the Palatine Hill. She was assigned a flamen minor.
- Pales, deity of shepherds, flocks and livestock.
- Panda, see Empanda.
- Parcae, the three fates.
- Pax, goddess of peace; equivalent of Greek Eirene.

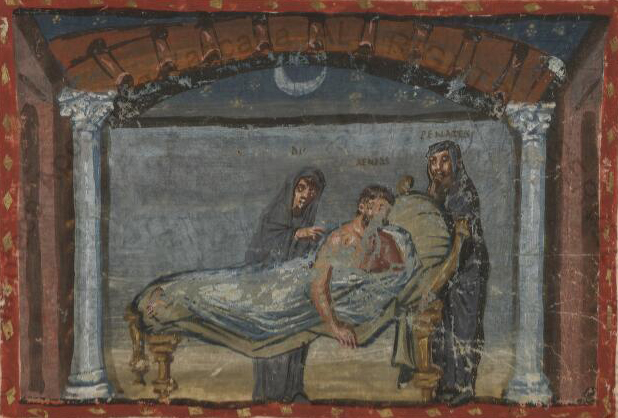
Aeneas and the Penates, from a 4th-century manuscript

- Penates or Di Penates, household gods.
- Picumnus, minor god of fertility, agriculture, matrimony, infants and children.
- Picus, Italic woodpecker god with oracular powers.
- Pietas, goddess of duty; personification of the Roman virtue pietas.
- Pilumnus, minor guardian god, concerned with the protection of infants at birth.
- Pluto, Greek Plouton, a name for the ruler of the dead popularized through the mystery religions and Greek philosophy, sometimes used in Latin literature and identified with Dis pater or Orcus.
- Pomona, goddess of fruit trees, gardens and orchards; assigned a flamen minor.
- Porrima, goddess of the future. Also called Antevorta. One of the Carmentes and the Camenae.
- Portunus, god of keys, doors, and livestock, he was assigned a flamen minor.
- Postverta or Prorsa Postverta, goddess of childbirth and the past, one of the two Carmentes (other being Porrima).
- Priapus, phallic guardian of gardens, originally Greek.
- Proserpina, Queen of the Dead, goddess of spring and a grain-goddess, the Roman equivalent of the Greek Persephone.
- Providentia, goddess of forethought.
- Pudicitia, goddess and personification of chastity, one of the Roman virtues. Her Greek equivalent was Aidôs.

=== Q ===
- Querquetulanae, nymphs of the oak.
- Quirinus, Sabine god identified with Mars; Romulus, the founder of Rome, was deified as Quirinus after his death. Quirinus was a war god and a god of the Roman people and state, and was assigned a flamen maior; he was one of the Archaic Triad gods.
- Quiritis, goddess of motherhood. Originally Sabine or pre-Roman, she was later equated with Juno.

=== R ===
- Robigo or Robigus, a god or goddess who personified grain disease and protected crops.
- Roma, personification of the Roman state.
- Rumina, goddess who protected breastfeeding mothers.

=== S ===
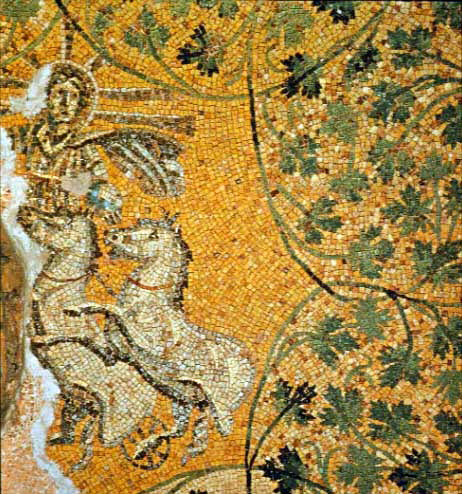
Sol Invictus, or Christ depicted in his guise. 3rd century AD

- Salacia, goddess of seawater, wife of Neptune. Equated with the Greek Amphitrite.
- Salus, goddess of the public welfare of the Roman people; came to be equated with the Greek Hygieia.
- Sancus, god of loyalty, honesty, and oaths.
- Saturn, a titan, god of harvest and agriculture, the father of Jupiter, Neptune, Juno, and Pluto.
- Scotus, god of darkness (Di inferi); brother of Terra, lover of Nox and opposite Dis. Greek Erebos; deep, shadow and one of the primordial deities.
- Securitas, goddess of security, especially the security of the Roman empire.
- Senectus, god of old age. His Greek equivalent is Geras.
- Silvanus, god of woodlands and forests.
- Sol/Sol Invictus, sun god.
- Somnus, god of sleep; equates with the Greek Hypnos.
- Soranus, a god later subsumed by Apollo in the form Apollo Soranus. An Underworld god.
- Sors, god of luck.
- Spes, goddess of hope.
- Stata Mater, goddess who protected against fires. Sometimes equated with Vesta.
- Sterquilinus ("Manure"), god of fertilizer. Also known as Stercutus, Sterculius, Straculius, Struculius.
- Suadela, goddess of persuasion, her Greek equivalent was Peitho.
- Summanus, god of nocturnal thunder.
- Sulis Minerva, a conflation of the Celtic goddess Sulis and Minerva

=== T ===
- Talasius, a god of marriage
- Tellumo or Tellurus, male counterpart of Tellus.
- Tempestas, a goddess of storms or sudden weather, usually plural as the Tempestates
- Terra Mater or Tellus, goddess of the earth and land. The Greek equivalent is Gaea, mother of titans, consort of Caelus (Uranus).
- Terminus, the rustic god of boundaries.
- Tiberinus, river god; deity of the Tiber river.
- Tibertus, god of the river Anio, a tributary of the Tiber.
- Tranquillitas, goddess of peace and tranquility.
- Trivia, goddess of crossroads and magic, equated with Hecate.

=== V ===
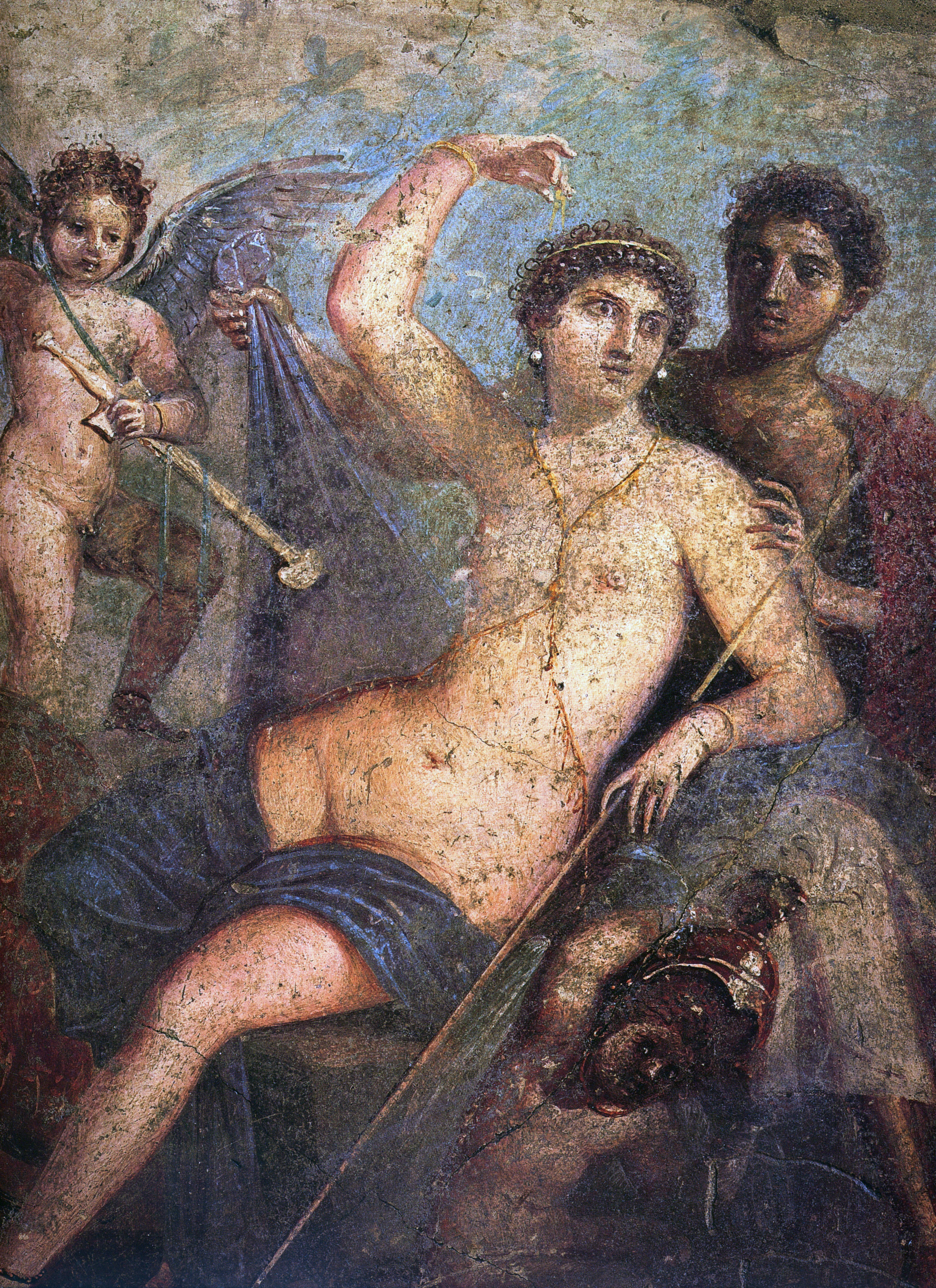
Venus, Vulcan, Mars, and Cupid on a wall painting from Pompeii

- Vacuna, ancient Sabine goddess of rest after harvest who protected the farmers' sheep; later identified with Nike and worshipped as a war goddess.
- Vagitanus, or Vaticanus, opens the newborn's mouth for its first cry.
- Vediovus or Veiovis, obscure god, a sort of anti-Jupiter, as the meaning of his name suggests. May be a god of the underworld.
- Venilia or Venelia, sea goddess, wife of Neptune or Faunus.
- Venti, the winds, equivalent to the Greek Anemoi: North wind Aquilo(n) or Septentrio (Greek Boreas); South wind Auster (Greek Notus); East wind Vulturnus (Eurus); West wind Favonius (Zephyrus); Northwest wind Caurus or Corus (see minor winds).
- Venus, goddess of love, beauty, sexuality, and gardens; mother of the founding hero Aeneas; one of the Dii Consentes.
- Veritas, goddess and personification of the Roman virtue of veritas or truth.
- Verminus, god of cattle worms.
- Vertumnus, Vortumnus or Vertimnus, god of the seasons, and of gardens and fruit trees.
- Vesta, goddess of the hearth, the Roman state, and the sacred fire; one of the Dii Consentes.
- Vica Pota, goddess of victory and competitions.
- Victoria, goddess of victory.
- Viduus, god who separated the soul and body after death.
- Virbius, a forest god, the reborn Hippolytus.
- Virtus, god or goddess of military strength, personification of the Roman virtue of virtus.
- Volturnus, god of water, was assigned a flamen minor. Not to be confused with Vulturnus.
- Voluptas, goddess of pleasure.
- Vulcan, god of the forge, fire, and blacksmiths, husband to Venus, and one of the Dii Consentes, was assigned a flamen minor.

== Titles and honorifics ==
Certain honorifics and titles could be shared by different gods, divine personifications, demi-gods and divi (deified mortals).

=== Augustus and Augusta ===
Augustus, "the elevated or august one" (masculine form) is an honorific and title awarded to Octavian in recognition of his unique status, the extraordinary range of his powers, and the apparent divine approval of his principate. After his death and deification, the title was awarded to each of his successors. It also became a near ubiquitous title or honour for various minor local deities, including the Lares Augusti of local communities, and obscure provincial deities such as the North African Marazgu Augustus. This extension of an Imperial honorific to major and minor deities of Rome and her provinces is considered a ground-level feature of Imperial cult.

Augusta, the feminine form, is an honorific and title associated with the development and dissemination of Imperial cult as applied to Roman Empresses, whether living, deceased or deified as divae. The first Augusta was Livia, wife of Octavian, and the title is then shared by various state goddesses including Bona Dea, Ceres, Juno, Minerva, and Ops; by many minor or local goddesses; and by the female personifications of Imperial virtues such as Pax and Victoria.

=== Bonus and Bona ===
The epithet Bonus, "the Good," is used in Imperial ideology with abstract deities such as Bona Fortuna ("Good Fortune"), Bona Mens ("Good Thinking" or "Sound Mind"), and Bona Spes ("Valid Hope," perhaps to be translated as "Optimism"). During the Republic, the epithet may be most prominent with Bona Dea, "the Good Goddess" whose rites were celebrated by women. Bonus Eventus, "Good Outcome", was one of Varro's twelve agricultural deities, and later represented success in general.

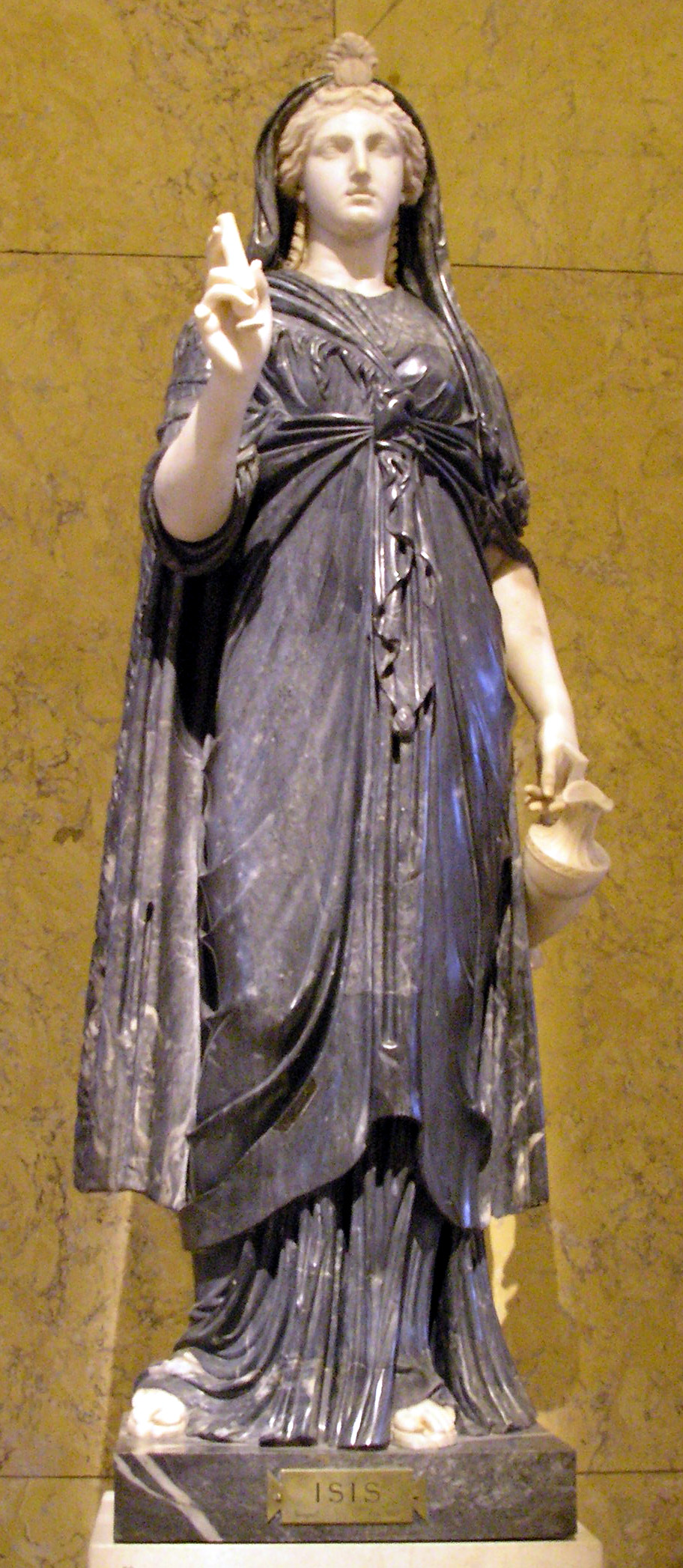
Roman Isis in black and white marble, from the time of Apuleius

=== Caelestis ===
From the middle Imperial period, the title Caelestis, "Heavenly" or "Celestial" is attached to several goddesses embodying aspects of a single, supreme Heavenly Goddess. The Dea Caelestis was identified with the constellation Virgo ("The Virgin"), who holds the divine balance of justice. In the Metamorphoses of Apuleius, the protagonist Lucius prays to the Hellenistic Egyptian goddess Isis as Regina Caeli, "Queen of Heaven", who is said to manifest also as Ceres, "the original nurturing parent"; Heavenly Venus (Venus Caelestis); the "sister of Phoebus", that is, Diana or Artemis as she is worshipped at Ephesus; or Proserpina as the triple goddess of the underworld. Juno Caelestis was the Romanised form of the Carthaginian Tanit.

Grammatically, the form Caelestis can also be a masculine word, but the equivalent function for a male deity is usually expressed through syncretization with Caelus, as in Caelus Aeternus Iuppiter, "Jupiter the Eternal Sky."

=== Invictus ===
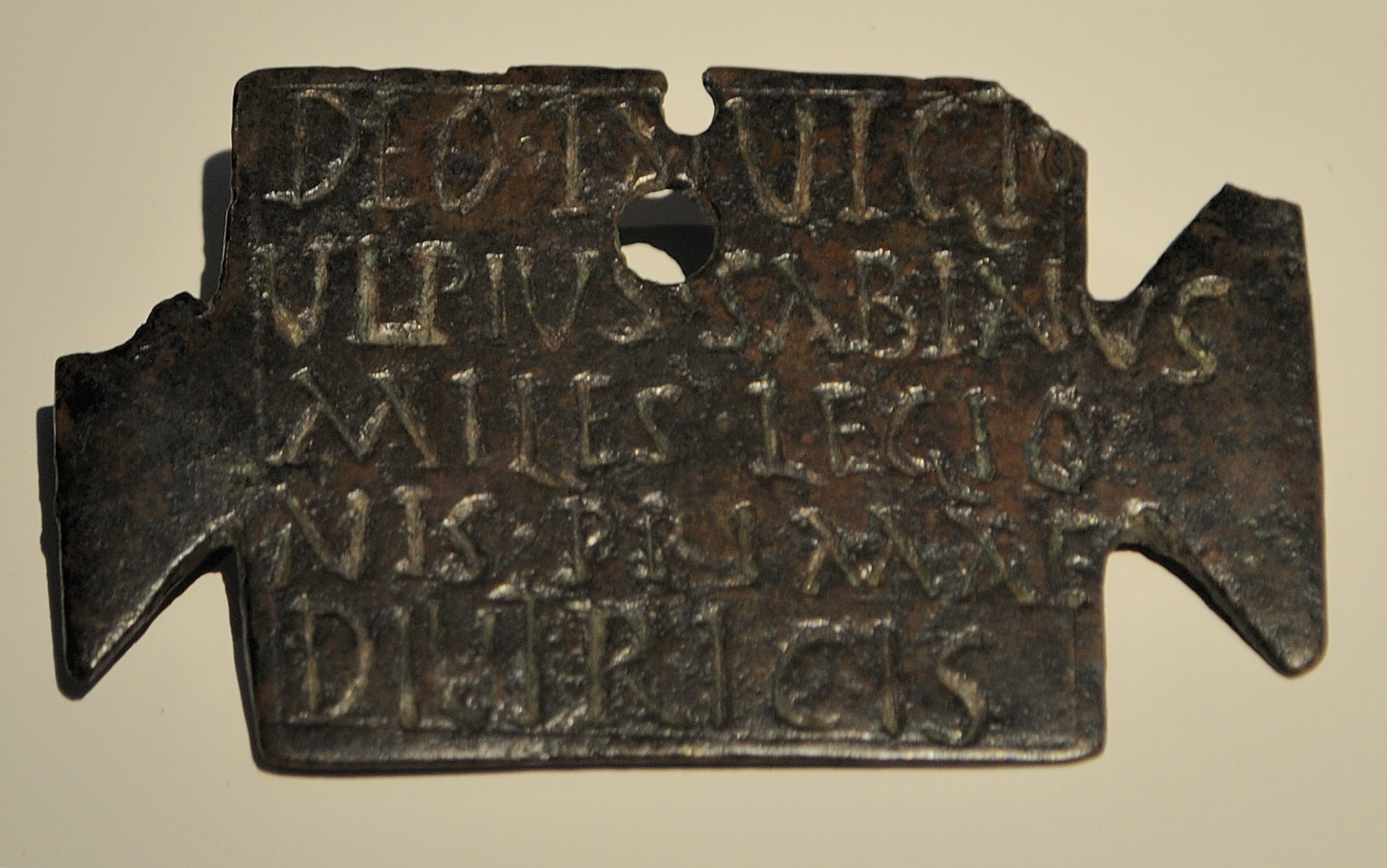
Dedication made to the Deus Invictus by a Roman legionary in Brigetio, Pannonia

Invictus ("Unconquered, Invincible") was in use as a divine epithet by the early 3rd century BC. In the Imperial period, it expressed the invincibility of deities embraced officially, such as Jupiter, Mars, Hercules, and Sol. On coins, calendars, and other inscriptions, Mercury, Saturn, Silvanus, Fons, Serapis, Sabazius, Apollo, and the Genius are also found as Invictus. Cicero considers it a normal epithet for Jupiter, in regard to whom it is probably a synonym for Omnipotens. It is also used in the Mithraic mysteries.

=== Mater and Pater ===
Mater ("Mother") was an honorific that respected a goddess's maternal authority and functions, and not necessarily "motherhood" per se. Early examples included Terra Mater (Mother Earth) and the Mater Larum (Mother of the Lares). Vesta, a goddess of chastity usually conceived of as a virgin, was honored as Mater. A goddess known as Stata Mater was a compital deity credited with preventing fires in the city.

From the middle Imperial era, the reigning Empress becomes Mater castrorum et senatus et patriae, the symbolic Mother of military camps, the senate, and the fatherland. The Gallic and Germanic cavalry (auxilia) of the Roman Imperial army regularly set up altars to the "Mothers of the Field" (Campestres, from campus, "field," with the title Matres or Matronae). See also Magna Mater (Great Mother) following.

Gods were called Pater ("Father") to signify their preeminence and paternal care, and the filial respect owed to them. Pater was found as an epithet of Dis, Jupiter, Mars, and Liber, among others.

==== Magna Mater ====
"The Great Mother" was a title given to Cybele in her Roman cult. Some Roman literary sources accord the same title to Maia and other goddesses.

== See also ==
- Classical planets
- Indigitamenta – Lists of Roman deities kept by the College of Pontiffs.
- Interpretato graeca – Comparison of Ancient Greek to other ancient polytheistic religions.
- List of Greek deities
- List of Mesopatamian deities
- List of Metamorphoses characters
- List of Roman agricultural deities
- List of Roman birth and childhood deities
- Reconstructionist Roman religion
- Roman imperial cult
