= Carmentalia =

Religious observance in ancient Rome

- Observed by: Roman Republic, Roman Empire
- Type: Classical Roman religion
- Date: 11 January; 15 January

Carmentalia was the two feast days (11 January and 15 January) of the Roman goddess Carmenta. She had her temple atop the Capitoline Hill. Carmenta was invoked in it as Postvorta and Antevorta, epithets which had reference to her power of looking back into the past and forward into the future. The festival was chiefly observed by women.

== See also ==
- Imperivm Romanvm Wiki - Carmentalia
