= Novensiles =

Class of Roman deities

In ancient Roman religion, the dii (also di) Novensiles or Novensides are collective deities of obscure significance found in inscriptions, prayer formularies, and both ancient and early-Christian literary texts.

In antiquity, the initial element of the word novensiles was thought to derive from either "new" (novus) or "nine" (novem). The form novensides has been explained as "new settlers," from novus and insidere, "to settle". The enduringly influential 19th-century scholar Georg Wissowa thought that the novensiles or novensides were deities the Romans regarded as imported, that is, not indigenous like the di Indigetes.

Although Wissowa treated the categories of indigetes and novensiles as a fundamental way to classify Roman gods, the distinction is hard to maintain; many scholars reject it. Arnaldo Momigliano pointed out that no ancient text poses novensiles and indigetes as a dichotomy, and that the etymology of novensides is far from settled. In his treatise on orthography, the 4th-century philosopher Marius Victorinus regarded the spellings novensiles and novensides as a simple phonetic alteration of l and d, characteristic of the Sabine language. Some ancient sources say the novensiles are nine in number, leading to both ancient and modern identifications with other divine collectives numbering nine, such as the nine Etruscan deities empowered to wield thunder or with the Muses. The name is thus sometimes spelled Novemsiles or Novemsides.

It may be that only the cults of deities considered indigenous were first established within the sacred boundary of Rome (pomerium), with "new" gods on the Aventine Hill or in the Campus Martius, but it is uncertain whether the terms indigetes and novensiles correspond to this topography. William Warde Fowler observed that at any rate a distinction between "indigenous" and "imported" begins to vanish during the Hannibalic War, when immigrant deities are regularly invoked for the protection of the state.

== The invocation of Decius Mus ==
The novensiles are invoked in a list of deities in a prayer formula preserved by the Augustan historian Livy. The prayer is uttered by Publius Decius Mus during the Samnite Wars as part of his vow (devotio) to offer himself as a sacrifice to the infernal gods when a battle between the Romans and the Latins has become desperate. Although Livy was writing at a time when Augustus cloaked religious innovation under appeals to old-fashioned piety and traditionalism, archaic aspects of the prayer suggest that it represents a traditional formulary as might be preserved in the official pontifical books. The other deities invoked — among them the Archaic Triad of Jupiter, Mars, and Quirinus, as well as the Lares and Manes — belong to the earliest religious traditions of Rome. Livy even explains that he will record the archaic ritual of devotio at length because "the memory of every human and religious custom has withered from a preference for everything novel and foreign." That the novensiles would appear in such a list at all, and before the indigetes, is surprising if they are "new."

Both the Lares and the Manes are "native" gods often regarded in ancient sources as the deified dead. Servius says that the novensiles are "old gods" who earned numinous status (dignitatem numinis) through their virtus, their quality of character. The early Christian apologist Arnobius notes other authorities who also regarded them as mortals who became gods. In this light, the novensiles, like the Lares and Manes, may be "concerned with the subterranean world where ancestors were sleeping."

== Sabine origin ==
According to Arnobius, a Piso, most likely the Calpurnius Piso Frugi who was an annalist and consul in 133 BC, said that the novensiles were nine gods whose cult had been established in Sabine country at Trebia. The location has been identified variously as the river Trebbia, Trevi nel Lazio, or one of the places called Trebula in antiquity, two of which — Trebula Mutusca and Trebula Suffenas — are in Sabine territory. Gary Forsythe has conjectured that Piso's family came from the middle Tiber Valley, on the border of Etruria and Sabine country, and that he was drawing on personal knowledge. The father of this Piso is probably the L. Calpurnius who dedicated a shrine to Feronia at Lucus Feroniae near Capena.

Varro, who was himself Sabine, placed the Novensides in his much-noted catalogue of Sabine deities. Inscriptions in Sabine country mention the novensiles or novensides, for instance, dieu. nove. sede at Pisaurum. A Marsian inscription also names the novensiles without the indigetes. The 19th-century scholar Edward Greswell sought to connect the nine novensiles of the Sabines to the nundinal cycle, the eight-day "week" of the Roman calendar that Roman inclusive counting reckoned as nine days.

== Nine deities ==
A 4th- or 3rd-century BC inscription from Ardea reading neven deivo has been taken to refer to the Novensiles as nine deities. Granius Flaccus and Aelius Stilo, Arnobius says, identify the Novensiles with the Muses, implying that they are nine in number. In the Roman tradition, the Muses became identified with the Camenae, the Latin goddesses of fresh-water sources and prophetic inspiration. The two best-known of the Camenae were Carmentis (or Carmenta), who had her own flamen and in whose honor the Carmentalia was held, and Egeria, the divine consort of Numa Pompilius, the second king of Rome considered the founder of Roman law and religion. Numa had established a bronze shrine at the fountain in their grove, the site of his divine union with Egeria. The fountain of the Camenae was a source of water for the Vestals.

The 5th-century scholar Martianus Capella placed the Dii Novensiles within his Etruscan-influenced celestial schema in his work On the Marriage of Mercury and Philology, and took their name as meaning "nine." He locates the Novensiles in the second region of the heavens, with Jove, Mars Quirinus, the "Military Lar," Juno, Fons ("Fountain" or "Source"), and the Lymphae (fresh-water goddesses).

== Council on lightning ==
Pliny mentions nine gods of the Etruscans who had the power of wielding thunderbolts, pointing toward Martianus's Novensiles as gods pertaining to the use of thunder and lightning (fulgura) as signs. Books on how to read lightning were one of the three main branches of the disciplina Etrusca, the body of Etruscan religious and divinatory teachings. Within the Etruscan discipline, Jupiter has the power to wield three types of admonitory lightning (manubiae) sent from three different celestial regions. The first of these, mild or "perforating" lightning, is a beneficial form meant to persuade or dissuade. The other two types are harmful or "crushing" lightning, for which Jupiter requires the approval of the Di Consentes, and completely destructive or "burning" lighting, which requires the approval of the di superiores et involuti (hidden gods of the "higher" sphere).

Several scholars have identified the Novensiles with the council of gods who decide on the use of the third, most destructive type of lightning. Carl Thulin proposed that two theonyms from the Piacenza Liver — a bronze model of a sheep's liver covered with Etruscan inscriptions pertaining to haruspicy — ought to be identified with the two councils, Cilens(l) with the Novensiles and Thufltha(s) with the Consentes Penates. The Novensiles would thus correspond to the di superiores et involuti and possibly the Favores Opertanei ("Secret Gods of Favor") referred to by Martianus Capella. Martianus, however, locates the Favores in the first region of the sky, with the Di Consentes and Penates, and the Novensiles in the second; the Favores are perhaps the Fata, "Fates".
