= Mellona =

Ancient Roman goddess

Mellona or Mellonia was an ancient Roman goddess said by St. Augustine to promote the supply of honey (Latin mel, mellis) as Pomona did for apples and Bubona for cattle. Arnobius describes her as "a goddess important and powerful regarding bees, taking care of and protecting the sweetness of honey."

W.H. Roscher includes Mellona among the indigitamenta, the list of deities maintained by Roman priests to assure that the correct divinity was invoked for rituals.

== See also ==
- Ah-Muzen-Cab, Mayan god of bees
- Aristaeus, ancient Greek god of bees
- Austėja, Lithuanian goddess of bees
- Bee (mythology)
- Bhramari, Hindu goddess of bees
- Bubilas, Lithuanian god of bees
- Colel Cab, Mayan goddess of bees
- Melissa, ancient Greek/Minoan nymph/goddess of bees
