= Picumnus =

Picumnus may refer to:

- Picumnus (mythology), a Roman deity
- Picumnus (bird), a bird genus
