= Porrima =

Porrima may refer to:

- Antevorta, a goddess in Roman mythology
- Gamma Virginis, a star in the constellation Virgo
- Schinia, a genus of insects known as flower moths
