= Tranquillitas =

Roman Goddess of Tranquility

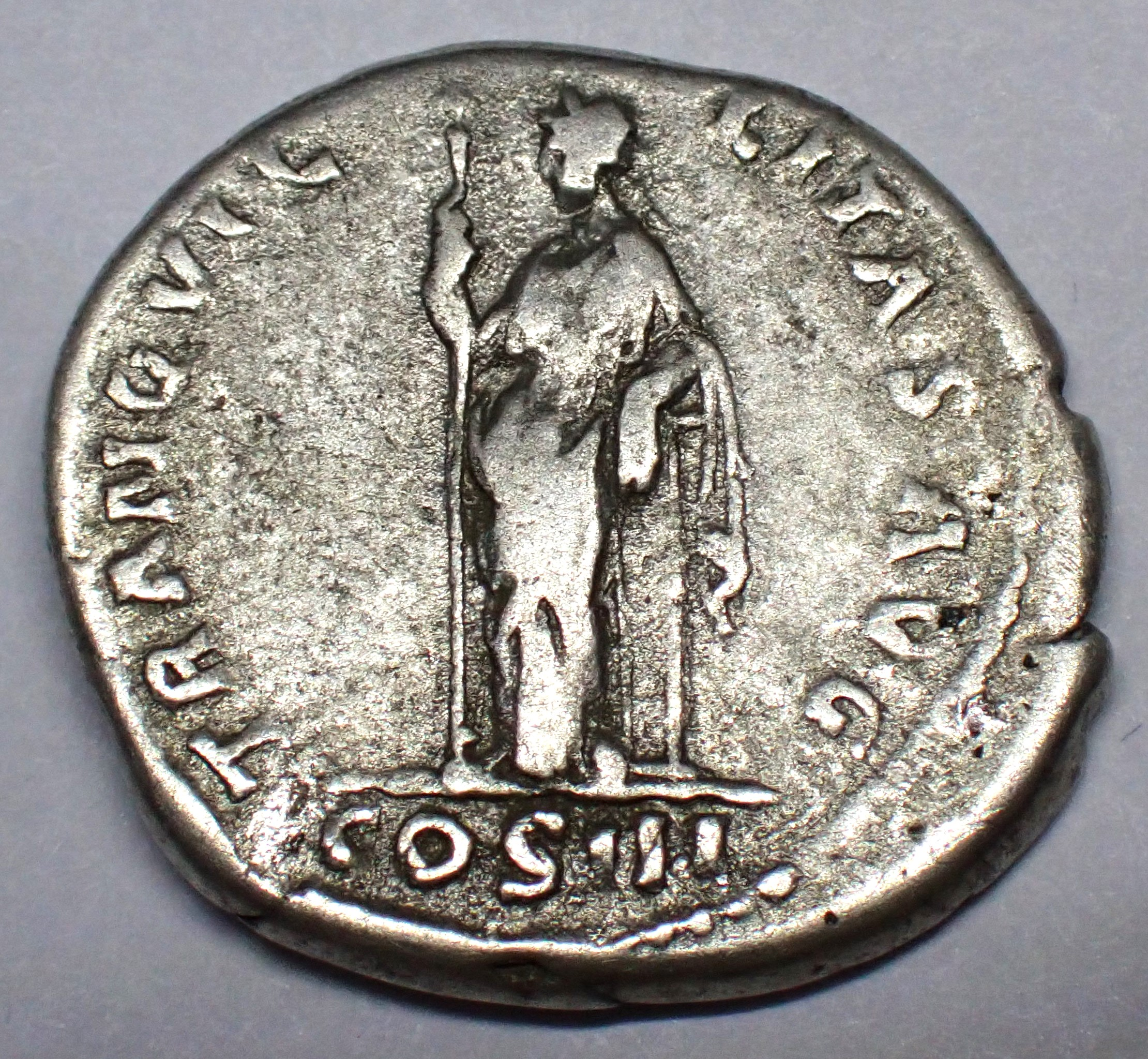
Tranquillitas depicted on a silver coin issued by Hadrian

In Roman mythology, Tranquillitas was one of the Imperial virtues and the personification of tranquility. She began to be portrayed as a deity in the 1st century CE alongside the goddesses Securitas, Tutela, and the pre-existing Salus. Together, these deities were responsible for the well-being and safety of Rome. She was likely the goddess of calm seas and associated with the food supply, maritime trade, and the security of the state.

== Function and worship ==
Under the Roman Republic, multiple virtues such as Virtus, Honos, and Pietas were given human forms and worshipped as minor deities with temples and cults. This practice was expanded upon during the Roman Empire, with the number of deified virtues expanding from around 16 to around 30. The new virtues were often used as tools of imperial propaganda, and tended to embody ideas of peace (pax) and security. Tranquillitas began to appear in the 1st century CE, and was frequently depicted on coinage beginning in the 2nd century CE. While Tranquillitas is an ambiguous figure, she may have been generally associated with political tranquility and public stability.

When she appeared on coinage, she was frequently given the epithet Augusti: the title of the emperor. This epithet drew a direct correlation between the virtue and the emperor— either as a character trait or a blessing he bestowed— and attempted to shape the Roman populace's opinion by crafting an image of a ruler endowed with endless, almost godly virtue. Coins depicting Tranquillitas were not circulated as frequently as those featuring Securitas; there was an eight-decade long interruption in her depictions between the rules of Antonius Pius and Philip the Arab, and then another interruption between Philip and Tacitus.

=== Goddess of Calm Seas ===
Tranquillitas was depicted in the "mosaic of the cosmos" found in the House of Mithras in Augusta Emerita, built at the end of the 1st century. The mosaic portrays a number of deities and personifications split between sea, land, and sky. Tranquillitas was depicted nude, with long hair and pearl-like bracelets, crown, and necklace. She appeared in the "sea" portion of the mosaic alongside deities such as Oceanus and Portunus, and humanoid representations of navigation (Navigia), lighthouses (Pharus), and the Euphrates.

In his Roman History, Appian describes how Octavian, before setting sail to take action against Pompey, offered sacrifices and libations to Neptune and "Waveless Ocean." White marble altars dating to the 1st century have been found with inscriptions dedicated to Neptune and Tranquillitas; they may have been utilized for rites similar to those described by Appian. Additionally, the Tranquillitas altar is carved with the image of a merchant ship. Imagery on Roman coinage support Tranquillitas’ connections with maritime trade, specifically the transport of grain, as she was often depicted with a rudder and corn. Through this connection to grain, Tranquillitas may have been related to Annona, the personification of the Roman grain supply.

=== Beata Tranquillitas ===
Starting in the 4th century, specifically during the reign of Constantine, the goddess and her depiction on coinage as Tranquillitas Augusti began to fall out of favor. She was replaced with the concept of Beata Tranquillitas ("blessed tranquility"), which was depicted as a celestial globe and three stars resting on an altar or cippus. Some scholars claim that Beata Tranquillitas indicated peace in the Roman Empire and a general sense of cosmic harmony that the emperor achieved with the assistance of higher powers.

== Imagery ==
In Roman coinage, Tranquillitas was typically depicted holding a hasta or sceptre. During the rule of Antonius Pius, she was depicted with a crenellated crown, ship's rudder, and ears of corn. She was additionally depicted with a globe on other coins. These items suggest Tranquillitas' association with fair seas, the grain supply, and maritime trade. The animal held in Tranquillitas' right hand has been subject to debate, and tends to change based on the emperor minting the coin. The animal has alternately appeared as a dolphin, dragon, capricornus, or hippocampus. The dolphin, capricornus, and hippocampus— all oceanic entities— support Tranquillitas' association with the sea. The dragon, which potentially appears on coins minted by Marcus Julius Phillipus and Tacitus, may suggest themes of trade, security, and prosperity tied to Roman army, as the dragon (draco) appeared on the military standard. Her depictions were similar to those of Securitas, a goddess personified around the same time; however, Securitas was almost always pictured leaning on a column.

== See also ==
- Securitas
- Spes
