= Summanus =

Roman god of nocturnal thunder

Summanus (Latin: Summānus) was the god of nocturnal thunder in ancient Roman religion, in some accounts as opposed to diurnal (daylight) thunder coming from Jupiter. His precise nature was unclear even to Ovid.

Pliny thought that he was of Etruscan origin, and one of the nine gods of thunder. Varro lists Summanus among gods to whom Sabine king Titus Tatius dedicated altars (arae) in consequence of a votum. Paulus Diaconus considers him a god of lightning.

The name Summanus is thought to be from Summus Manium "the greatest of the Manes", or sub-, "under" + mane, "morning", therefore "nighttime."

According to Martianus Capella, Summanus is another name for Pluto as the "highest" (summus) of the Manes. This identification is taken up by later writers such as Camões ("If in Summanus' gloomy realm / Severest punishment you now endure ...") and Milton, in a simile to describe Satan visiting Rome: "Just so Summanus, wrapped in a smoking whirlwind of blue flame, falls upon people and cities".

Georges Dumézil has argued that Summanus would represent the uncanny, violent and awe-inspiring element of the gods of the first function, connected to heavenly sovereignty. The double aspect of heavenly sovereign power would be reflected in the dichotomy Varuna-Mitra in Vedic religion and in Rome in the dichotomy Summanus-Dius Fidius. The first gods of these pairs would incarnate the violent, nocturnal, mysterious aspect of sovereignty while the second ones would reflect its reassuring, daylight and legalistic aspect.

== Temple and cult ==
The temple of Summanus was dedicated during the Pyrrhic War c. 278 BCE on June 20. It stood at the west of the Circus Maximus, perhaps on the slope of the Aventine. It seems the temple had been dedicated because the statue of the god which stood on the roof of the temple of Jupiter Capitolinus had been struck by a lightning bolt and its head knocked off. The haruspices announced that it had been hurled into the Tiber River, where indeed it was found. The temple of Summanus itself was struck by lightning in 197 BCE.

Every June 20, the day before the summer solstice, round cakes called summanalia, made of flour, milk, and honey and shaped as wheels (perhaps a solar symbol) were offered to Summanus as a token of propitiation. Summanus also received a sacrifice of two black oxen or wethers. Dark animals were typically offered to chthonic deities.

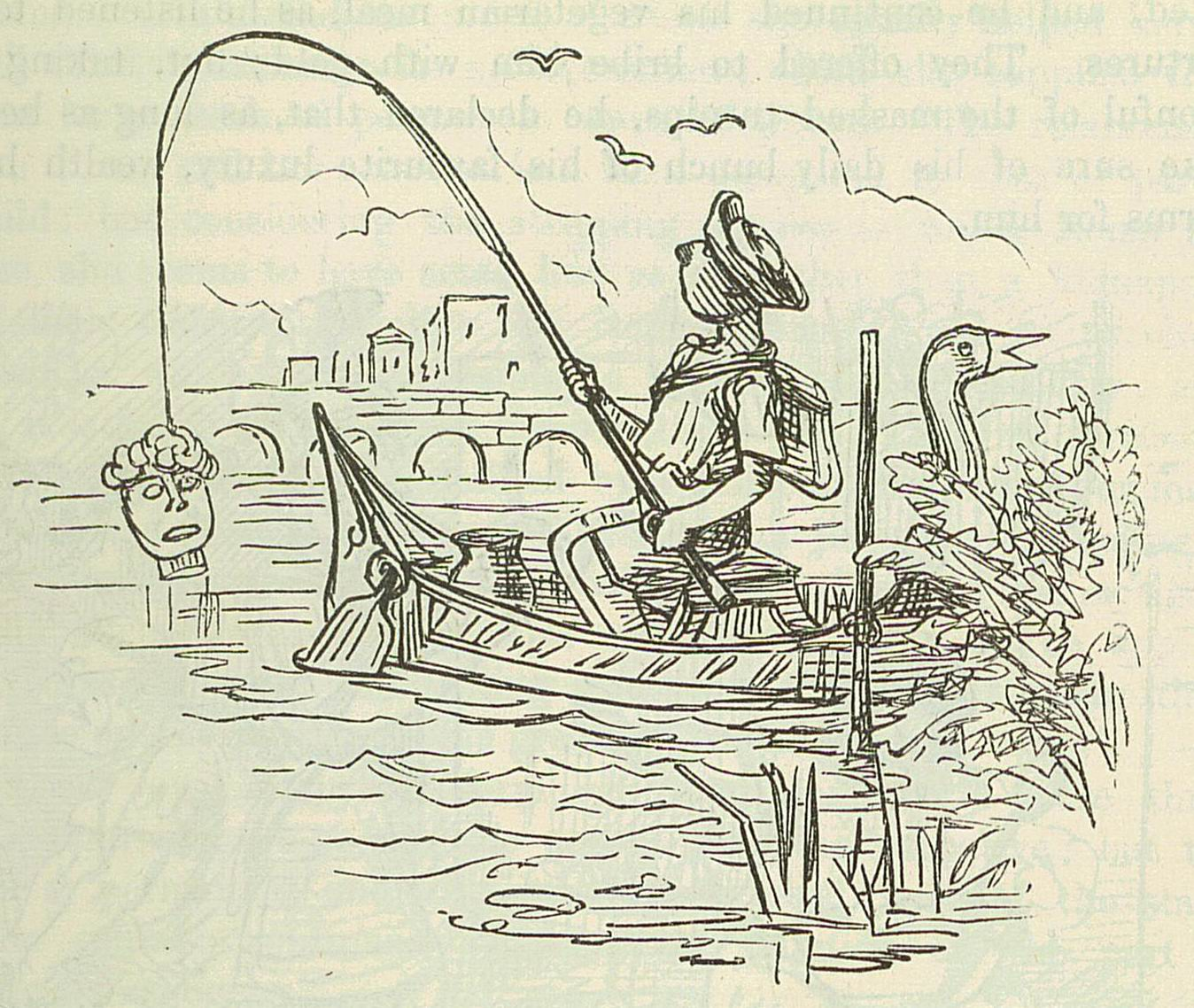
"Discovery of the Head of Summanus" (John Leech)

Saint Augustine records that in earlier times Summanus had been more exalted than Jupiter, but with the construction of a temple that was more magnificent than that of Summanus, Jupiter became more honored.

== Summanus and Mount Summano ==
Mount Summano (elevation 1291 m), located in the Alps near Vicenza (Veneto, Italy), is traditionally considered a site of the cults of Pluto, Jupiter Summanus, and the Manes.

The area was one of the last strongholds of ancient Roman religion in Italy, as shown by the fact that Vicenza had no bishop until 590 CE.

Archeological excavations have found a sanctuary space that dates to the first Iron Age (9th century BCE) and was continuously active until late antiquity (at least the 4th century CE). The local flora is very peculiar, because it was customary in ancient times for pilgrims to bring offerings of flowers from their own native lands.

The mountaintop is frequently struck by lightning. The mountain itself has a deep grotto named Bocca Lorenza, in which, according to local legend, a young shepherdess became lost and disappeared. The story might be an adaptation of the myth of Proserpina, who was abducted by Pluto.
