= Bonus Eventus =

Roman deity

Bonus Eventus ("Good Outcome") was a divine personification in ancient Roman religion. The Late Republican scholar Varro lists him as one of the twelve deities who presided over agriculture, paired with Lympha, the goddess who influenced the water supply. The original function of Bonus Eventus may have been agricultural, but during the Imperial era, he represents a more general concept of success and was among the numerous abstractions who appeared as icons on Roman coins.

== Cult and inscriptions ==
Bonus Eventus had a temple of unknown date in the Campus Martius. It is mentioned only by Ammianus Marcellinus, in connection to a new portico (Porticus Boni Eventūs) built by the urban prefect Claudius in 374 AD. Five Corinthian capitals "of extraordinary size" that were uncovered in the 19th century may have belonged to the portico, which was located in the Gardens of Agrippa.

The epithet Bonus, "the Good," is used with other abstract deities such as Bona Fortuna ("Good Fortune"), Bona Mens ("Good Thinking" or "Sound Mind"), and Bona Spes ("Valid Hope," perhaps to be translated as "Optimism"), as well as with the mysterious and multivalent Bona Dea, a goddess whose rites were celebrated by women.

Inscriptional evidence for the god is found at several locations, including in the provinces. Senior officials at Sirmium, Pannonia, dedicated a shrine to Bonus Eventus for the wellbeing of high-ranking members of the city council. In Roman Britain, the mosaic floor of a villa at Woodchester bore the reminder Worship Bonus Eventus duly. A dedication made by a married couple to Bonus Eventus along with Fortuna indicates that the god's sphere of influence had expanded beyond both agriculture and the embodiment of imperial virtues. Images of Bonus Eventus appear regularly on engraved gems, and in a jeweller's hoard from Snettisham, Bonus Eventus was the most frequent device on intaglios, appearing on 25 percent of the 127 found. These usages point to a protective or tutelary function for the god, as well as the existence of a religious community to which the jeweller marketed his wares.

== Iconography ==
Coins featuring Bonus Eventus were issued during the turmoil of the Year of Four Emperors (69 AD) and the reigns of Galba, Vespasian, Titus, Antoninus Pius, and Septimius Severus. On these coins and on gems, Bonus Eventus is a standing male nude, usually with one leg bent and his head turned away toward a libation bowl in his outstretched hand. Sometimes he is partially clad in a chlamys that covers his back, or in an over-the-shoulder himation with the ends framing his torso. Poppies and stalks of grain are common attributes.

In his book on sculpture, Pliny describes two statues of "Bonus Eventus" which were in fact renamed images of Greek gods. One was a bronze by Euphranor and the other a marble by Praxiteles. The latter stood in the Capitolium with a statue of Bona Fortuna, and the former somewhere between the repurposed Athena below the Capitol and the Leto in the Temple of Concord. It is unclear from Pliny's description whether both Greek statues had originally represented the same Greek deity. The classical art historian Adolf Furtwängler conjectured that Praxiteles had depicted an Agathos Daimon, since he was accompanied by a "Bona Fortuna," presumably a translation of the Greek Agathē Tychē. Euphranor's bronze is sometimes taken as the type on which the iconography of coins and gems was based, since the figure held poppies and grain. These attributes suggest an Eleusinian deity, and while the Greek original is most often taken as Triptolemus, no extant depictions of Triptolemus show the combination of poppies and grain, which is associated with Demeter (Roman Ceres).
