= Deverra =

Roman childbirth goddess

In Roman mythology, Deverra (apparently from Latin deverro "to sweep away") was one of the three gods that protected midwives and women in labor, the other two being Pilumnus and Intercidona. Symbolised by a broom used to sweep away evil influences, she ruled over the brooms used to purify temples in preparation for various worship services, sacrifices and celebrations.

== See also ==
- List of Roman birth and childhood deities
