= Dii involuti =

Etruscan veiled gods

In Etruscan religion, the dii involuti ("veiled" or "hidden gods", also di involuti or dii superiores et involuti) were a group of gods, or possibly a principle, superior to the ordinary pantheon of gods. In contrast to the ordinary Etruscan gods, including the Dii Consentes, the dii involuti were not the object of direct worship and were never depicted. Their specific attributes and number are unknown; Jean-René Jannot suggests that they may represent either an archaic principle of divinity or "the very fate that dominates individualized gods".

The sky-god Tinia was believed to require their consent to cast the thunderbolt that announced disasters. According to Seneca in his Naturales quaestiones,

The third manubia Jupiter also sends, but he summons to council the gods whom the Etruscans call the Superior, or Veiled Gods [diis quos superiores et involutos vocant], because the lightning destroys whatever it strikes and everywhere alters the state of private or public affairs that it encounters, for fire allows nothing to remain as it was.

The dii involuti may be identical with the "Secret Gods of Favour" mentioned by Martianus Capella.
