= Suadela =

In Roman mythology, Suada (also called by the diminutive Suadela) was the goddess of persuasion, particularly in the realms of romance, seduction and love. She was strongly associated with Venus. Her Greek name was Peitho, and she was worshipped as a divinity in Sicyon, where she was honoured with a temple in the agora. Sometimes she is associated with or counted as one of the Graces, being part of Venus’s retinue. Plutarch observed in his Quaestiones Romanae (part of the Moralia) that the married couple needed five gods: Nuptial Jupiter, Nuptial Juno, Venus, Suada, and above all Diana, whom women call upon in childbirth.
