= Salus =

Roman goddess of safety and well-being

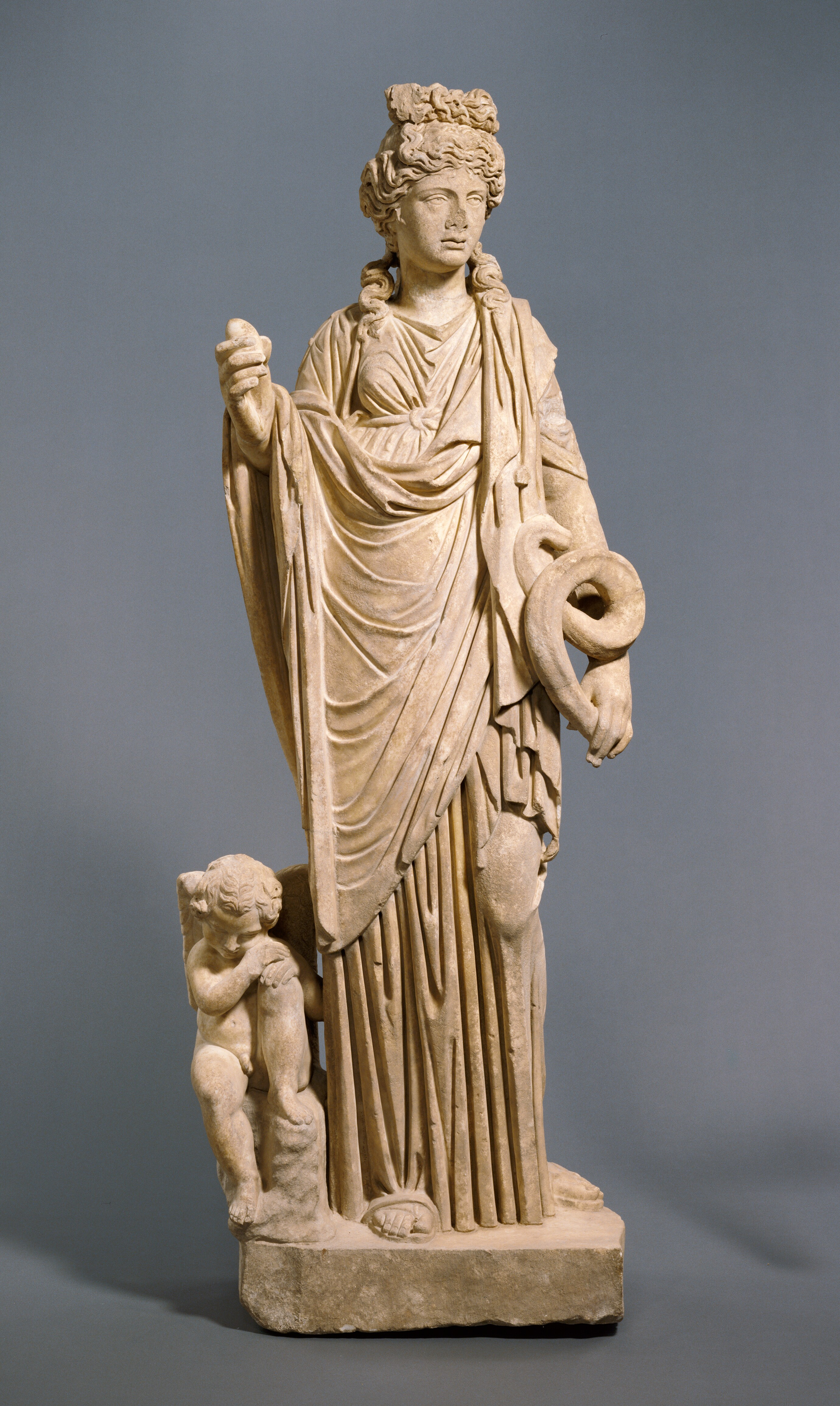
3rd-century statue of Salus in the Getty Villa

Salus (Latin: salus, "safety", "salvation", "welfare") was the Roman goddess of safety and well-being (welfare, health and prosperity) of both the individual and the state. She is sometimes equated with the Greek goddess Hygieia, though their functions differ considerably.

Salus is one of the oldest Roman goddesses: she has also been referred to as Salus Semonia, a fact that might hint at her belonging to the category of the Semones (gods such as Semo Sancus Dius Fidius). The two gods had temples in Rome on the Collis Salutaris and Mucialis respectively, two adjacent hilltops of the Quirinal located in the regio Alta Semita. The temple of Salus, as Salus Publica Populi Romani, was voted in 304 BC, during the Samnite Wars, by dictator Gaius Junius Bubulcus Brutus, dedicated on 5 August 302, and adorned with frescos at the order of Gaius Fabius Pictor.

The high antiquity and importance of the cult of Salus is testified by the little-known ceremony of the Augurium Salutis, held every year on August 5 for the preservation of the Roman state. Her cult was spread over all Italy. Literary sources record relationships with Fortuna and Spes. She started to be increasingly associated with Valetudo, the Goddess of Personal Health and the romanized name of Hygieia.

Later, Salus also became a protector of personal health. Around 180 BCE, sacrificial rites in honor of Apollo, Aesculapius, and Salus took place (Livius XL, 37). There was a statue to Salus in the temple of Concordia. She is first known to be associated with the snake of Aesculapius from a coin of 55 BC minted by M. Acilius. Her festival was celebrated on March 30.

== Salus and Sancus ==
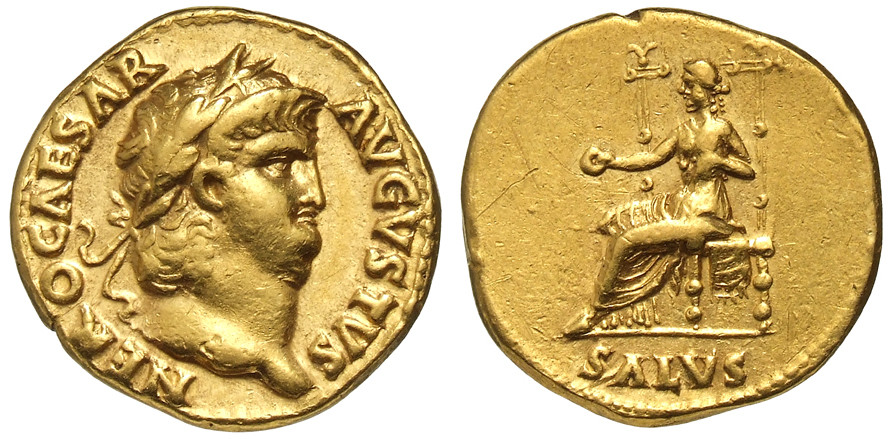
Gold coin of AD 65/66, with the figure of Salus (seated and holding patera), most likely struck to celebrate the suppression of the Pisonian conspiracy against Nero.

The two deities were related in several ways. Their shrines (aedes) were very close to each other on the Quirinal (see above). Some scholars also claim some inscriptions to Sancus have been found on the Collis Salutaris. Moreover, Salus is the first in the series of deities mentioned by Macrobius as related in their sacrality: Salus, Semonia, Seia, Segetia, Tutilina, who required the observance of a dies feriatus of the person who happened to utter their name. These deities were connected to the ancient agrarian cults of the valley of the Circus Maximus that remain mysterious.

German scholars Georg Wissowa, Eduard Norden and Kurt Latte write of a deity named Salus Semonia, who is attested to only in one inscription of year 1 A.D., mentioning a Salus Semonia in its last line (seventeen). Scholars agree that this line is a later addition of uncertain date. In other inscriptions, Salus is never connected to Semonia.

== Representation ==
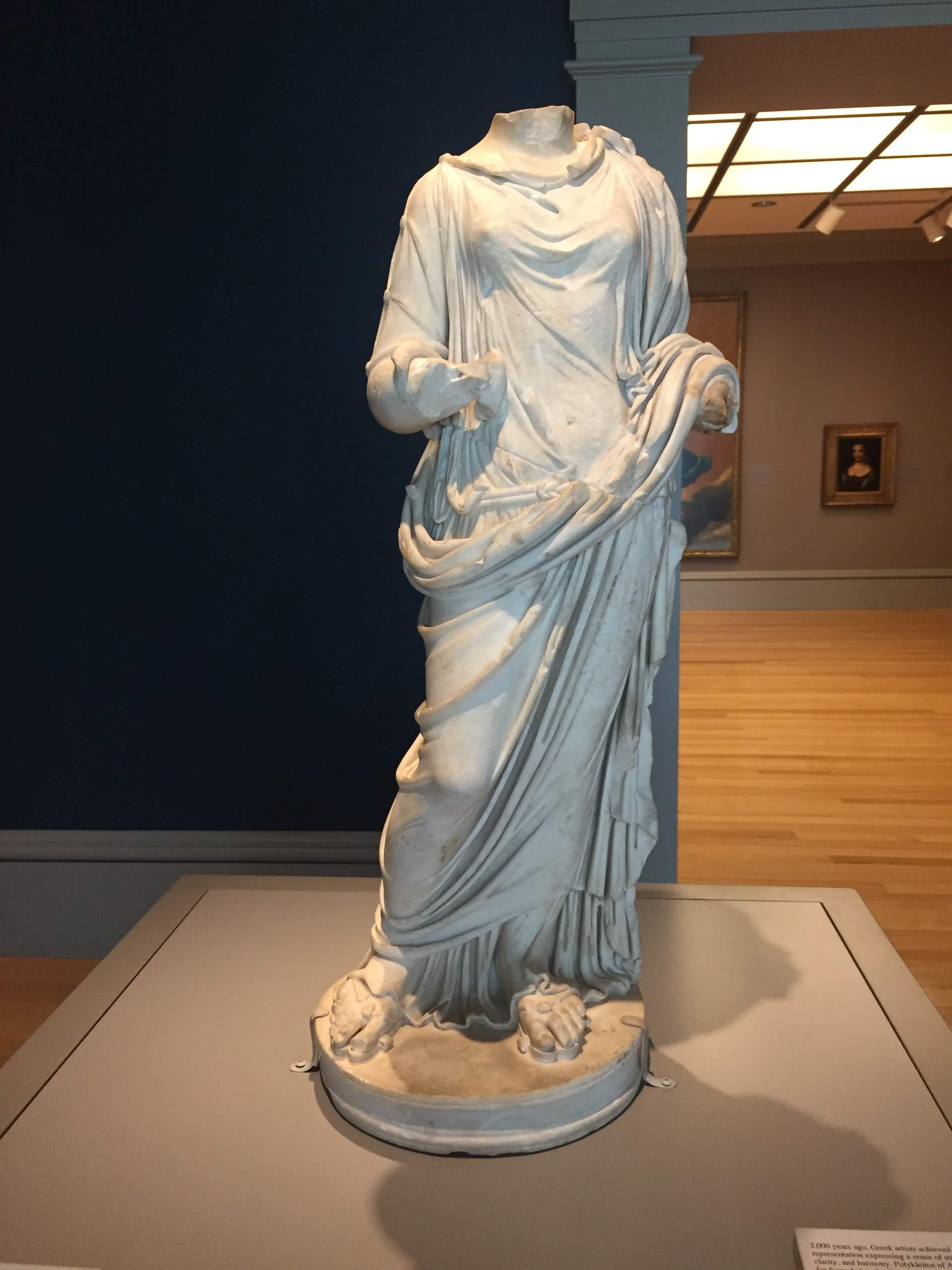
A marble statuette of Salus made during the Roman Imperial Period (c. 69–192 A.D.)

Salus was often shown seated with her legs crossed (a common position for Securitas), leaning her elbow on the arm of her throne. Often, her right hand holds out a patera (shallow dish used in religious ceremonies) to feed a snake which is coiled round an altar. The snake is reared up and dips its head to the patera.

Sometimes her hand is open and empty, making a gesture. Sometimes the snake directs its gaze along with hers. Sometimes there is no altar; the snake is coiled around the arm of her throne instead.

Occasionally, Salus has a tall staff in her left hand with a snake twined around it; sometimes her right hand raises a smaller female figure. Later, Salus is shown standing, feeding her snake. This became the most common pose: she is standing and grasping the wriggling snake firmly under her arm, directing it to the food she holds out on a dish in her other hand. Rarely, Salus is holding a steering oar in her left hand indicating her role in guiding the emperor through a healthy life. This really belongs to Fortuna.

Three statues from Cologne, Woodchester, and Mainz, along with the Mainz Jupiter Column, depict a goddess standing on a bull's head. The identification of this goddess was debated for a long time. During construction work in the port area of Mainz in 2020, one of these statues was discovered. It was the first and only one to bear an inscription on its base that names the goddess depicted as Salus. The bull's head was likely a sacrificial animal symbolizing prosperity.

== Bibliography ==
1. W. Köhler in Enciclopedia dell' Arte Antica Roma Istituto Treccani 1965 (online) s.v.
2. The Inscriptions of Roman Tripolitania (IRT), eds. J.M. Reynolds and Ward Perkins, Rome & London 1952, nos 918–919.
3. René Rebuffat: "Les Centurions du Gholaia", Africa Romana II (1984), pp 233– 238.
4. René Rebuffat: "Le poème de Q.Avidius Quintianus à la Déesse Salus", Karthago XXI, 1986–7, pp 95– 105.
5. Omran (Ragab Salaam): The Limes Numidiae et Tripolitanus Under the Emperor Septimius Severus AD193-211, Unpublished PhD dissertation, Vienna University- Austria 2003, pp 76–79.
6. Adams (J.N.) and Iasucthan (M. Porcius): "The Poets of Bu Njem: Language, Culture and the Centurionate", The Journal of Roman Studies (JRS), Vol. 89 (1999), pp. 109–134.

== See also ==
- Hygieia, the Greek goddess of health
- Salus populi suprema lex esto
- Sirona, a goddess of health worshiped in East Central Gaul
