= Fontus =

Roman god of wells

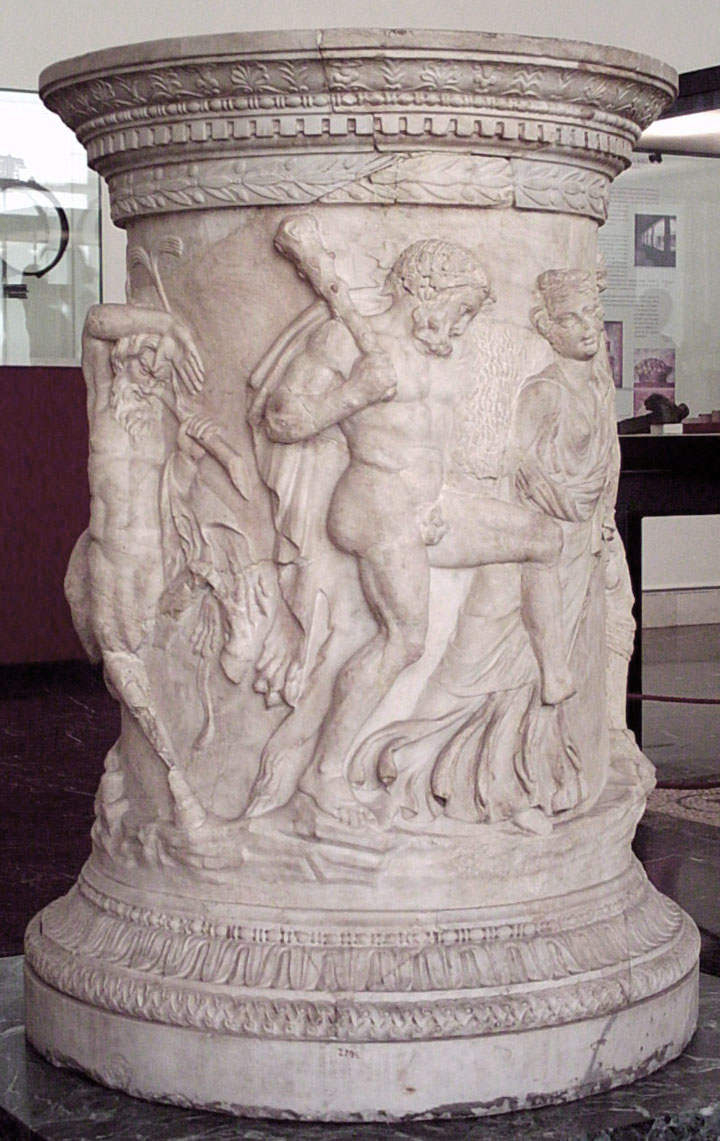
Ornamental wellhead (puteal) (1st century AD) depicting a drunken Hercules as part of a Bacchic revel

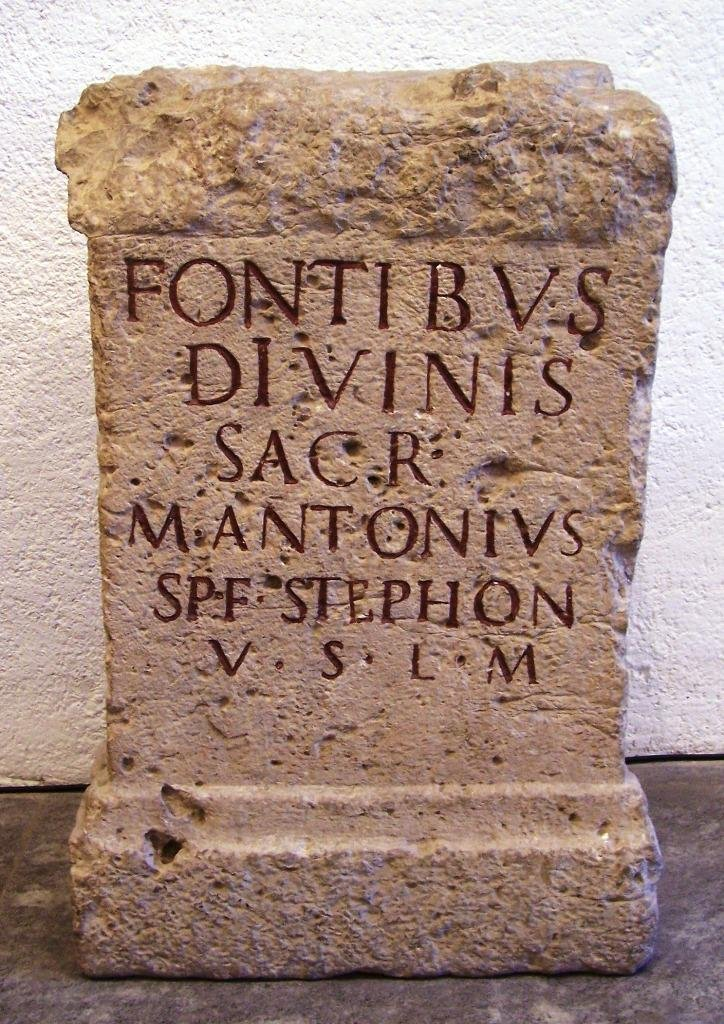
Votive altar dedicated to the Divine Fontes (plural)

Fontus or Fons (pl.: Fontes, "Font" or "Source") was a god of wells and springs in ancient Roman religion. A religious festival called the Fontinalia was held on October 13 in his honor. Throughout the city, fountains and wellheads were adorned with garlands.

Fontus was the son of Juturna and Janus. Numa Pompilius, second king of Rome, was supposed to have been buried near the altar of Fontus (ara Fontis) on the Janiculum. William Warde Fowler observed that between 259 and 241 BC, cults were founded for Juturna, Fons, and the Tempestates, all having to do with sources of water. As a god of pure water, Fons can be placed in opposition to Liber as a god of wine identified with Bacchus.

An inscription includes Fons among a series of deities who received expiatory sacrifices by the Arval Brothers in 224 AD, when several trees in the sacred grove of Dea Dia, their chief deity, had been struck by lightning and burnt. Fons received two wethers. Fons was not among the deities depicted on coinage of the Roman Republic.

The gens Fonteia claimed to be Fontus's descendants.

In the cosmological schema of Martianus Capella, Fons is located in the second of 16 celestial regions, with Jupiter, Quirinus, Mars, the Military Lar, Juno, Lympha, and the Novensiles.

== Fons Perennis ==
Water as a source of regeneration played a role in the Mithraic mysteries, and inscriptions to Fons Perennis ("Eternal Spring" or "Never-Failing Stream") have been found in mithraea. In one of the scenes of the Mithraic cycle, the god strikes a rock, which then gushes water. A Mithraic text explains that the stream was a source of life-giving water and immortal refreshment. Dedications to "inanimate entities" from Mithraic narrative ritual, such as Fons Perennis and Petra Genetrix ("Generative Rock"), treat them as divine and capable of hearing, like the nymphs and healing powers to whom these are more often made.

== Honours ==
Fontus Lake in Antarctica is named after the deity.
