= Faustitas =

Roman goddess of livestock

In Roman mythology, the goddess Faustitas (Latin: "good fortune") had the responsibility of protecting the herd and livestock. According to Horace, she walked about farmlands together with Ceres, ensuring their fruitfulness.
