= Fulgora (mythology) =

Widow goddess mentioned by Varro

According to Augustine of Hippo's The City of God (5th century AD), Fulgora was a Roman goddess mentioned in Varro's Antiquitates rerum humanarum et divinarum (1st century BC). As quoted by Augustine, Varro cites Fulgora as an example of a widow goddess, alongside Populonia and Rumina. According to Robert Dyson, she was "presumably the goddess of, or who protects against, lightning (fulgor)". Writing in 1910, Georg Wissowa considered it evident that Fulgora was a female equivalent of Fulgur, an epithet of Jupiter, though he notes that the prospect of the name's use as an epithet of Juno goes against the description of Fulgora as a widow. Fulgora is unattested beyond this passage from Augustine.
