= Talasius =

God of marriage in Roman mythology

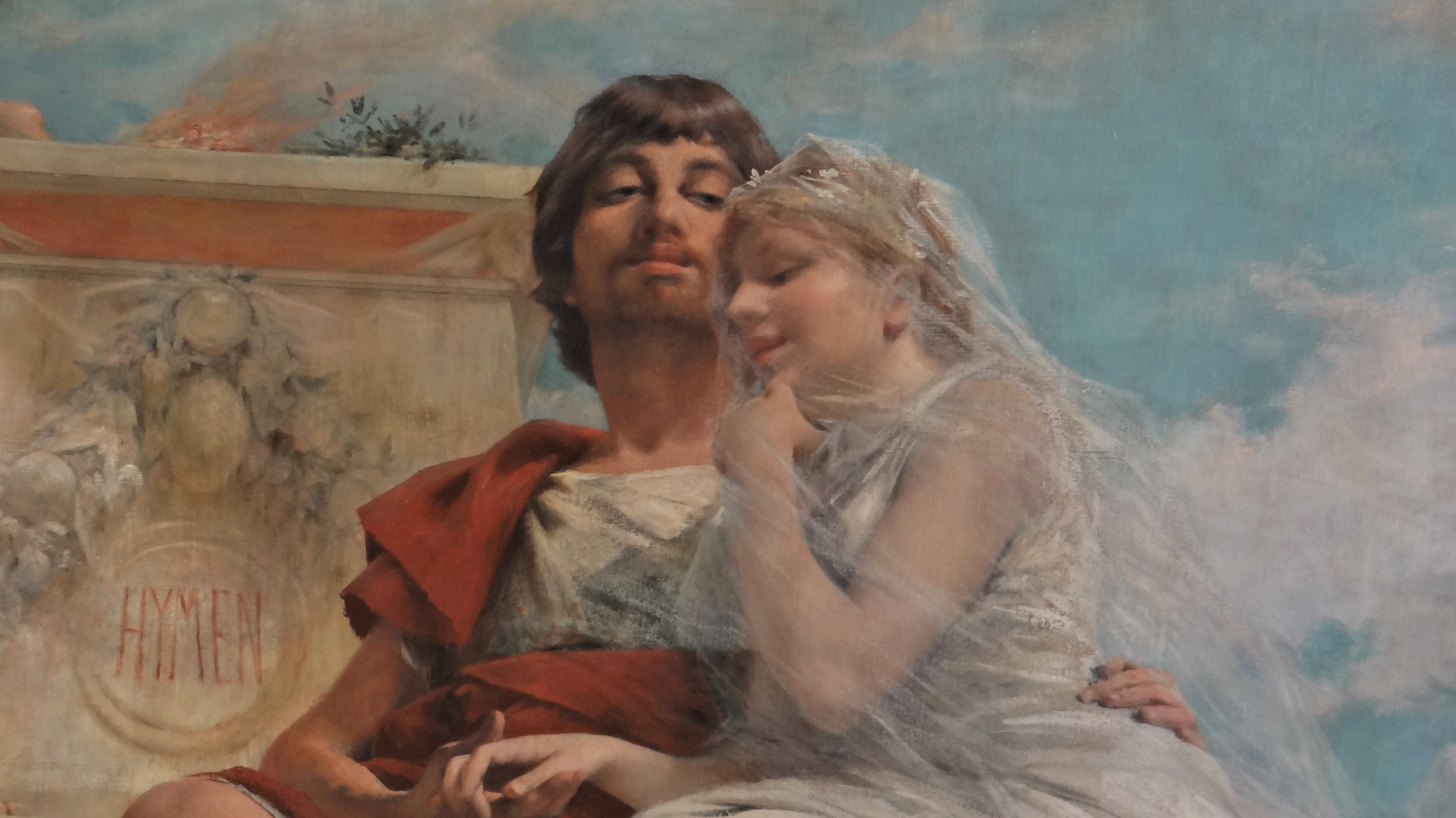
painting visualization of Talasius or Hymen by Théobald Chartran

Talasius is also known as Thalasius, Talassus and Talassio is a god of marriage in Roman mythology. His equivalent in Greek mythology is Hymen. His name was called out during marriages. The name was derived from Thalasus, which means "wool-basket". Later accounts state that he is friend of Romulus, and that he played a role in the rape of the Sabine women.

== Sources ==
- Catullus, 61, 134.
- Livy. History of Rome i, 9.12.
- Plurarch. Quaestiones Romanae, 31.
