= Bubona =

Roman goddess of cattle

In ancient Roman religion, Bubona is thought to have been a goddess of cattle, but she is named only by Saint Augustine.

Augustine mocks Bubona as one of the minor Roman deities whose names correspond to their functions, and derives her name from the Latin word bos (genitive bovis, hence English "bovine"), which usually means "ox" in the singular and "cattle" in the plural (bubus in the dative and ablative plural; compare bubulcus, one who drives or tends cattle). The formation of this theonym has been compared to that of Bellona, "she who presides over war (bellum)"; Pomona, "she who presides over orchard fruits (pomum)"; and Epona, the Romano-Celtic horse goddess (from Gaulish epos, "horse") whose image was placed in stables as a tutelary for the animals.

Augustine mentions Bubona in two passages. In addition to the passage on theonyms and divine personifications, he lists her among several other deities who had specialized functions for the Romans, in contrast to the one god of the Jews.

Georg Wissowa thought that a festival of cattle (ludi boum causa) mentioned by Pliny must have been dedicated to Bubona. Those who celebrated the rites were called Bubetii, a title which appears only in Pliny.

== Classical tradition ==
In the 18th century, formal gardens often featured sculptures of classical divinities, which were to be selected for the deity's suitability to the function of the area: Silvanus for a grove, for example, or Pomona for an orchard. Bubona was among those recommended for "small paddocks of sheep."
