= Picumnus (mythology) =

Roman god

In Roman mythology, Picumnus was a god and the brother of Pilumnus, another god. Both brothers may have been agricultural deities.
