= Pilumnus =

Roman nature deity

In Roman mythology, Pilumnus ("staker") was a nature deity, brother of Picumnus. He ensured children grew properly and stayed healthy. Ancient Romans made an extra bed after the birth of a child in order to ensure the help of Pilumnus. He also taught humanity how to grind grain. He was also sometimes identified as the father of Daunus and the ancestor of Turnus.

A ceremony to honour the deity involved driving a stake into the ground.
