= Dii Consentes =

List of twelve major deities in the pantheon of Ancient Rome

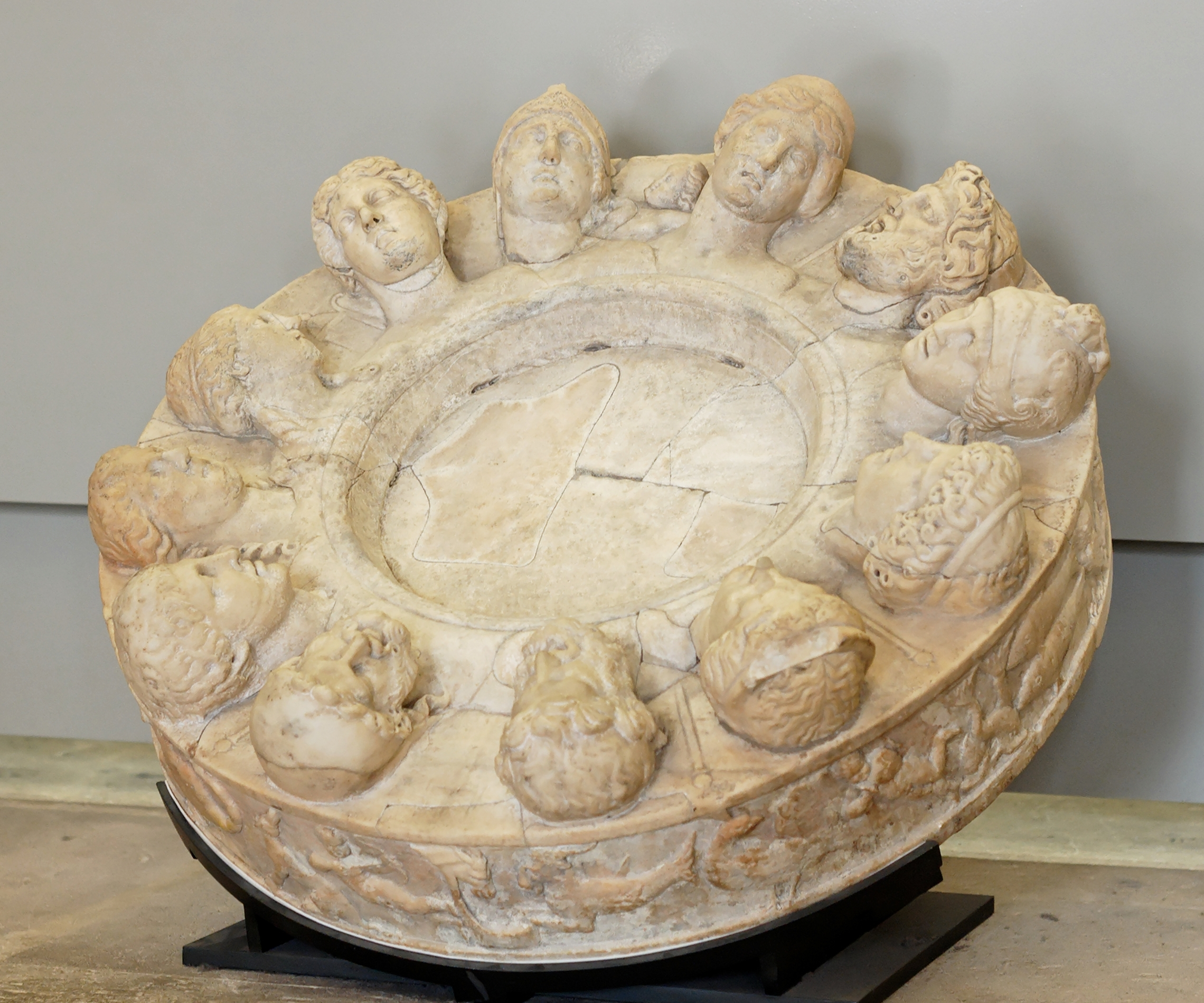
Although the ritual purpose of this 1st century BCE altar from Gabii is unclear, the twelve deities depicted correspond to the Dii Consentes

The Dii Consentes, also known as Di or Dei Consentes (once Dii Complices), or The Harmonious Gods, is an ancient list of twelve major deities, six gods and six goddesses, in the pantheon of Ancient Rome. Their gilt statues stood in the Roman Forum, and later apparently in the Porticus Deorum Consentium.

The gods were listed by the poet Ennius in the late 3rd century BCE in a paraphrase of an unknown Greek poet:

Juno, Vesta, Minerva, Ceres, Diana, Venus
Mars, Mercurius, Iovis, Neptunus, Vulcanus, Apollo

Livy arranges them in six male-female pairs: Jupiter-Juno, Neptune-Minerva, Mars-Venus, Apollo-Diana, Vulcan-Vesta and Mercury-Ceres. Three of the Dii Consentes formed the Capitoline Triad: Jupiter, Juno and Minerva.

== Precursor lists ==
The grouping of twelve deities has origins older than the Greek or Roman sources.

=== Hittite ===
The Greek grouping may have Hittite origins via Lycia, in Anatolia. A group of twelve Hittite gods is known both from cuneiform texts and from artistic representation. All the Hittite Twelve are male, with no individualizing features. The Roman Empire period group is a possible reflex of the Lycians' twelve gods: By 400 BCE, a precinct dedicated to twelve gods existed at the marketplace in Xanthos, Lycia.

=== Egyptian ===
Herodotus mentions a group of twelve gods in Egypt, but this cannot be confirmed in any Egyptian sources.

=== Greek ===
The Greek cult of the Twelve Olympians can be traced to 6th century BCE Athens and has no apparent precedent in the Mycenaean period. The altar to the Twelve Olympians at Athens is usually dated to the archonship of the younger Pesistratos, in 522–521 BCE. By the 5th century BCE, there are well-attested cults of the Twelve Olympians in Olympia and at the Hieron on the Bosphorus.

=== Etruscan ===
The references to twelve Etruscan deities come from later Roman authors, writing long after the influence of the Greek pantheon had become dominant, and must be regarded with skepticism. Arnobius states that the Etruscans had a set of six male and six female deities which they called consentes and complices because they rose and set together, implying an astronomical significance, and that these twelve acted as councillors of Jupiter.

Scholarly evaluation of this account depends on the hypothesis that the Etruscans originally immigrated to Italy from Anatolia. In this case, the Etruscan Twelve might have been cognate to the Hittite Twelve. However, Etruscan artifacts show extensive use of Etruscan translations of Greek mythology; it is just as likely that both the Etruscan Twelve and the Roman Twelve were simply adaptations of the Greek Twelve.

== See also ==
- Di indigetes
- Interpretatio graeca § Greco-Roman equivalents
- Proto-Indo-European mythology
- Twelve Olympians, the equivalent grouping of the Greek pantheon
