= Postverta =

Roman goddess

In Roman mythology, Postverta or Postvorta was the goddess of the past and one of the two Carmentes (along with her sister Antevorta, or Prorsa, a contracted form of Proversa). They were companions of the goddess Carmenta, and probably embodied her aspects as the goddess of the past (Postvorta) and the future (Antevorta, or Prorsa).

During childbirth, prayers were offered to summon the Carmentes to preside over the labor. Porrima was said to be present at the birth when the baby was born head-first; Postverta, when the feet of the baby came first.

== See also ==
- Camenae
- List of Roman birth and childhood deities
