= Antevorta =

Roman goddess of the future

In ancient Roman religion, Antevorta was a goddess of the future, also known as Porrima or Prorsa (a contracted form of Proversa). She and her sister Postverta (or Postvorta) were described as companions or siblings of the goddess Carmenta, sometimes referred to as "the Carmentae". They may have originally been two aspects of Carmenta, namely those of her knowledge of the future and the past (compare the two-faced Janus). Ovid describes the deities as goddesses of prophecy, writing that Porrima was thought to have "sung" ("cecinisse") of the past ("porro"), whereas Postverta sung of the future.

Antevorta and Postvorta had two altars in Rome and were invoked by pregnant women as protectors against the dangers of childbirth. Antevorta was said to be present at the birth when the baby was born head-first; Postverta, when the feet of the baby came first. According to Aulus Gellius, a 2nd-century Roman grammarian, writes—citing the older author 1st-century BCE author Varro—that altars were constructed to the gods Postverta and Prorsa so as to avert the risk of difficult childbirth.

== Star name ==
Antevorta is an alternative star name for Gamma Virginis, officially named Porrima.

== See also ==
- Atropos
- Camenae
- List of Roman birth and childhood deities
- Skuld
