= Camenae =

Goddesses in Roman mythology

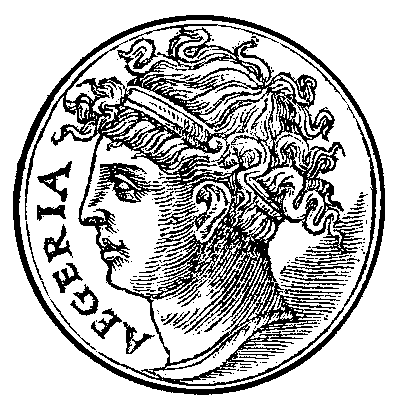
A 16th-century drawing of Egeria by Guillaume Rouille

In Roman mythology, the Camenae (also Casmenae, Camoenae) were originally goddesses of childbirth, wells and fountains, and also prophetic deities.

== Mythology ==
Some mythological figures associated with the Camenae include:

- Carmenta, or Carmentis
- Egeria, or Ægeria, or Aegeria
- Antevorta, or Porrima, or Prorsa
- Postverta, or Postvorta

The last two were sometimes specifically referred to as the Carmentae and in ancient times might have been two aspects of Carmenta rather than separate figures; in later times, however, they are distinct beings believed to protect women in labor.

It is not clear whether these were in fact Camenae themselves, or just closely connected to them.

=== Relationship with the Muses ===
The Camenae were later identified with the Greek Muses. The first instance of this is in Livius Andronicus' translation of Homer's Odyssey, rendering the Greek word Mousa (Μοῦσα) as Camena.

Horace refers to poetic inspiration as the "soft breath of the Greek Camena" (spiritum Graiae tenuem Camenae) in Odes II.16. He also mentions the "nine Camenae" (novem Camenae) in the Carmen Saeculare, which denotes the Muses.

== In Latin literature ==
Latin authors used the Camenae as a Latinized version of the Greek Muses. This began with Livius Andronicus and continued with Gnaeus Naevius' epitaph. However, their use waned afterwards until a resurgence around the time of Horace.

== See also ==
- Casmenae
- Crinaeae
- Naiad
- Nymph
- Pegasides
