= Securitas =

Roman goddess of security and stability

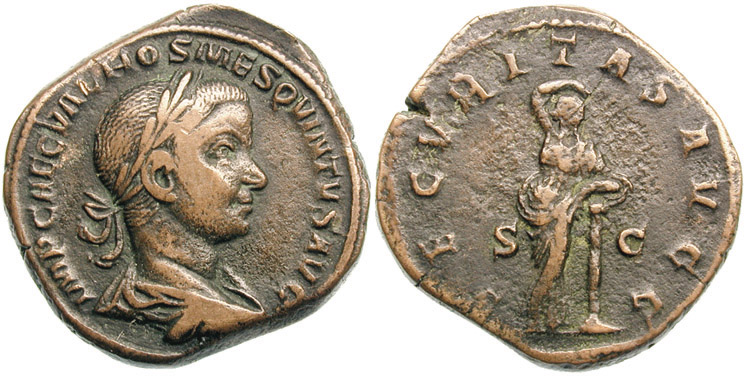
Securitas, the security of the Roman Empire, celebrated on the reverse of this sestertius by Hostilian.

In Roman mythology, Securitas was the goddess of security and stability, especially the security of the Roman Empire. On coinage Securitas was usually depicted leaning on a column. She first appears on a coin in 62 AD and then becomes a usual coin motif in the following centuries.

On Sardinia during the Roman imperial period, a Latin inscription described the tomb of Titus Vinius as a shrine of Securitas.
