= Indigitamenta =

Ancient Roman lists of deities

In ancient Roman religion, the indigitamenta were lists of deities kept by the College of Pontiffs to assure that the correct divine names were invoked for public prayers. These lists or books probably described the nature of the various deities who might be called on under particular circumstances, with specifics about the sequence of invocation. The earliest indigitamenta, like many other aspects of Roman religion, were attributed to Numa Pompilius, second king of Rome.

== Sources ==
The books of the Pontiffs are known only through scattered passages preserved throughout Latin literature. Varro, a 1st-century BCE writer, is assumed to have drawn on direct knowledge of the lists in writing his now-fragmentary theological books. Servius the Grammarian claims that, according to Varro, the indigitamenta were a series of pontifical books that contained the names of gods and the justifications for those names, and also that the names of the numina were present in these texts. Varro's work was also used as a reference by the Church Fathers for their mocking catalogues of minor deities. As William Warde Fowler noted,

the good Fathers tumbled the whole collection about sadly in their search for material for their mockery, having no historical or scientific object in view; with the result that it now resembles the bits of glass in a kaleidoscope, and can no longer be re-arranged on the original Varronian plan.

Georg Wissowa, however, asserted that Varro's lists were not indigitamenta, but di certi, gods whose function could still be identified with certainty, since by the late Republic some of the most archaic deities of the Roman pantheon were not widely cultivated and understood. Another likely source for the patristic catalogues is the lost work De indigitamentis of Granius Flaccus, Varro's contemporary. Arnobius, a 3rd-century Christian apologist, writes that the name of the god Apollo was not present in the indigitamenta of Numa Pompilius, who was generally considered in Roman legend to have been the organizer of many Roman religious practices. It is probable that these specific early indigitamenta date back prior to 431 BCE—the date when Apollo received an official temple, and therefore presumably a place in the Roman pantheon. However, the passage also implies that Apollo was present in later versions of the indigitamenta, which is perhaps further supported by the works of the 4th-century CE theologian Augustine, who does mention Apollo among a list of gods that appears to have been drawn from an older Varronian source covering the indigitamenta.

W.H. Roscher collated the standard modern list of indigitamenta, though other scholars may differ with him on some points.

== Form ==
It is unclear whether the written indigitamenta contained complete prayer formularies, or simply an index of names. If formulas of invocation, the indigitamenta were probably precationum carmina, chants or hymns of address. Paulus defines them as incantamenta, incantations, and indicia, signs or intimations.

A further point of uncertainty is whether these names represent distinct minor entities, or epithets pertaining to an aspect of a major deity's sphere of influence, that is, an indigitation, or name intended to "fix" or focalize the action of the god so invoked. If the former, the indigitamenta might be described as indexing "significant names which bespoke a specialized divine function," for which the German term Sondergötter is sometimes used; for instance, Vagitanus gives the newborn its first cry (vagitus). If the indigitamenta record invocational epithets, however, an otherwise obscure deity such as Robigus, the red god of wheat rust, should perhaps be understood as an indigitation of Mars, red god of war and agriculture; Maia, "a deity known apparently only to the priests and the learned," would be according to Macrobius an indigitation of the Bona Dea. Roscher, however, does not consider Robigus and Maia to have been part of the indigitamenta.

== Roscher's list of indigitamenta ==
Many of the indigitamenta are involved in the cycle of conception, birth, and child development (marked BCh); see List of Roman birth and childhood deities. Several appear in a list of twelve helper gods of Ceres as an agricultural goddess or are named elsewhere as having specialized agricultural functions (Ag). Gods not appearing on either of those lists are described briefly here, or are more fully described in their own articles as linked.

- Abeona BCh
- Adeona BCh
- Adolenda, see Acta Arvalia
- Aescolanus, god of copper money (aes) and father of Argentinus (below)
- Afferenda, goddess whose purpose was the offering of dowries
- Agenoria BCh
- Agonius
- Aius Locutius
- Alemona BCh
- Altor Ag
- Antevorta BCh
- Arculus, tutelary god of chests and strongboxes (arcae)
- Argentinus, god of silver money; see Aescolanus above
- Ascensus, god of sloping terrain and hillsides, from the verb scando, scandere, scansus, "scale, climb"
- Aventinus
- Bubona
- Caeculus
- Candelifera BCh
- Cardea
- Catius pater BCh
- Cela, perhaps a title of Panda
- Cinxia BCh
- Clivicola, "she who inhabits the clivus," a slope or street
- Coinquenda, see Acta Arvalia
- Collatina, a goddess of hills (Latin collis "hill")
- Coluber, marked by Roscher as uncertain
- Commolenda or Conmolanda, see Acta Arvalia
- Conditor Ag
- Convector Ag
- Cuba BCh
- Cunina BCh
- Decima
- Deferunda, see Acta Arvalia
- Deverra
- Domiduca
- Domiducus
- Domitius, god who preserves the home (domus) of newlyweds
- Edusa (also Educa, Edula, Edulia)
- Fabulinus BCh
- Farinus BCh
- Fessona or Fessonia, goddess who relieved weariness.
- Fluvionia or Fluonia BCh
- Forculus, protector of doors (Latin fores)
- Fructesea, another name for Seia Ag
- Hostilina Ag
- Iana
- Inporcitor Ag
- Insitor Ag
- Intercidona
- Interduca
- Iuga BCh
- Iugatinus BCh
- Lactans Ag
- Lacturnus Ag
- Lateranus
- Levana
- Libentina or Lubentina
- Lima, a goddess of the threshold (limen)
- Limentinus, god of the limen or limes
- Limi or Limones (plural), guardian spirits (curatores) of Rome's clivi (slopes, streets)
- Locutius BCh
- Lucina BCh
- Lucrii (plural)
- Manturna, a conjugal goddess who causes the couple to remain together (from the verb maneo, manere)
- Mellona
- Mena BCh
- Messia Ag
- Messor Ag
- Mola
- Montinus, a god of mountains; compare Septimontius
- Morta
- Mutunus Tutunus or Tutinus
- Nemestrinus, god of groves (nemora, singular nemus)
- Nenia
- Noduterensis Ag
- Nodutus Ag
- Nona
- Numeria BCh
- Nundina BCh
- Obarator Ag
- Occator Ag
- Odoria
- Orbona BCh
- Ossipago BCh
- Panda or Empanda
- Pantica
- Parca
- Partula
- Patella Ag
- Patellana Ag
- Paventina BCh
- Pellonia
- Peragenor
- Perfica
- Pertunda BCh
- Peta
- Picumnus
- Pilumnus BCh
- Pollentia
- Porrima BCh
- Postverta or Postvortia BCh
- Potina BCh
- Potua BCh
- Praestana
- Praestitia
- Prema mater BCh
- Promitor Ag
- Prorsa BCh
- Puta
- Reparator Ag
- Rediculus
- Rumina BCh
- Rumon?
- Runcina Ag
- Rusina
- Rusor
- Sarritor or Saritor Ag
- Sator Ag
- Segesta Ag
- Segetia
- Seia Ag
- Semonia
- Sentia BCh
- Sentinus BCh
- Septimontius
- Serra
- Spiniensis
- Stata Mater
- Statanus BCh
- Statilinus BCh
- Statina BCh
- Sterquilinus
- Stercutus
- Stimula, identified with Semele
- Strenia
- Subigus pater BCh
- Subruncinator Ag
- Tutanus
- Tutilina Ag
- Unxia
- Vagitanus BCh
- Vallonia
- Venilia
- Verminus
- Vervactor Ag
- Vica Pota
- Victa
- Viduus
- Virginiensis BCh
- Viriplaca
- Vitumnus BCh
- Voleta
- Volumna BCh
- Volumnus
- Volupia
- Volutina Ag
