= Iana (goddess) =

Ancient Roman goddess of the moon

Iana is the name of an ancient Roman goddess associated with arches and the moon, usually identified as either a form of Diana or the female counterpart of Janus.

Varro (1st century BC) uses the name in his agricultural treatise, in a passage of dialogue in which the interlocutors explain that some farming tasks should be done when the moon is waxing, while the waning phase facilitates others, such as harvesting, shearing sheep, and clearing woodlands. It seems to be a name used by country people. Orosius (5th century AD) has a form Ianium (in some readings) equivalent to Dianium, referring to either a shrine or the Temple of Diana on the Aventine Hill. Diana is one of the Roman goddesses most often identified with the moon, but Usener thought Iana might be better identified with Juno Lucina.

The Church Father Tertullian, however, calls Iana a diva arquis, "goddess of arches" (Latin arcus or arquus, "arch; rainbow"). The arch as a passageway or portal suggests Iana as the female counterpart of Janus, whose role as a "doorkeeper" includes functions pertaining to time and the heavens. Varro's contemporary Nigidius Figulus identified Janus with Apollo and Iana with Diana.

W.H. Roscher includes Iana among the indigitamenta, the list of deities maintained by Roman priests to assure that the correct divinity was invoked for rituals.

== See also ==
- Cardea
