= Vatican Hill =

Hill in Rome where St. Peter's Basilica is located

Coordinates: 41°54′13″N 012°27′01″E

- Hill of Rome
- Latin name: Mons Vaticanus
- Italian name: Colle Vaticano
- Rione: Borgo
- Buildings: Circus of Nero
- Churches: St Peter's Basilica

Location on a map of Vatican City

Vatican Hill (Latin: Mons Vaticanus; Italian: Colle Vaticano) is a hill in Rome, located on the right bank (west side) of Tiber river, opposite to the traditional seven hills of Rome. The hill also gave the name to Vatican City. It is the location of St. Peter's Basilica.

== Etymology ==
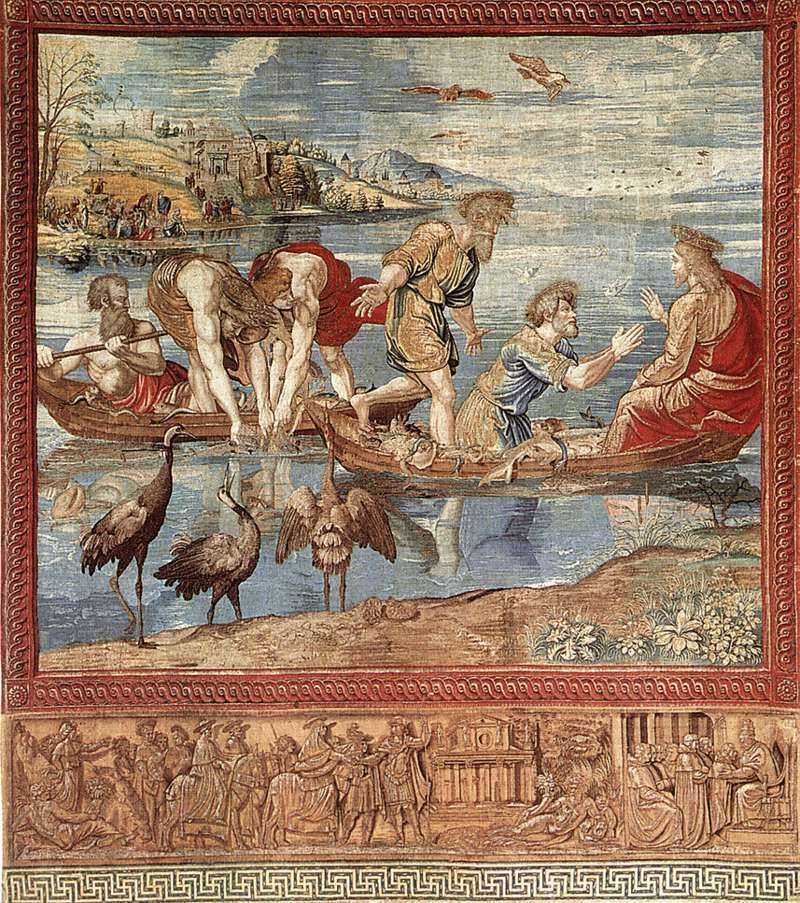
Vatican Hill (top left corner) in The Miraculous Draught of Fishes (1519), from the Acts of the Apostles tapestry series by the Flemish workshop of Pieter van Endigen Aelst, based on Raphael

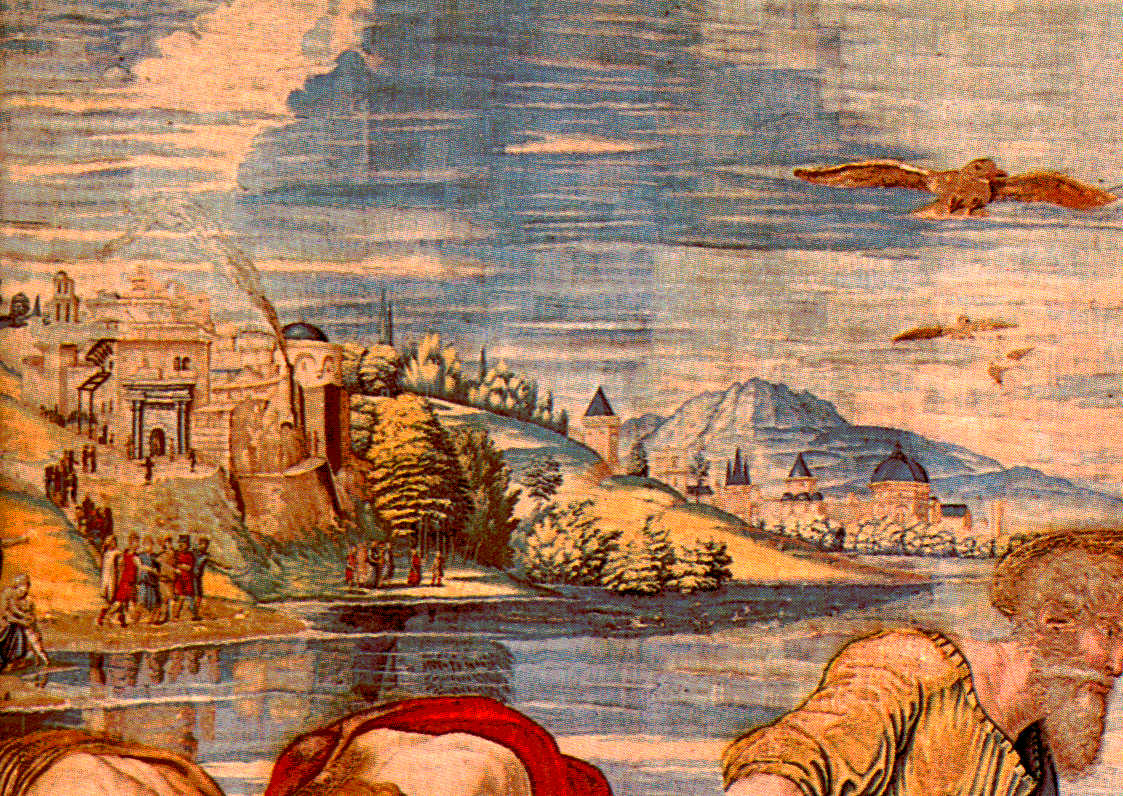
Detail of Vatican Hill

The ancient Romans had several opinions about the derivation of the Latin word Vaticanus. Varro (1st century BC) connected it to a Deus Vaticanus or Vagitanus, a Roman deity thought to endow infants with the capacity for speech evidenced by their first wail (vagitus, the first syllable of which is pronounced [waː-] in Classical Latin). Varro's rather complicated explanation relates this function to the tutelary deity of the place and to the advanced powers of speech possessed by a prophet (vates), as preserved by the later antiquarian Aulus Gellius:

We have been told that the word Vatican is applied to the hill, and the deity who presides over it, from the vaticinia, or prophecies, which took place there by the power and inspiration of the god; but Marcus Varro, in his book on Divine Things, gives another reason for this name. "As Aius," says he, "was called a deity, and an altar was built to his honour in the lowest part of the new road, because in that place a voice from heaven was heard, so this deity was called Vaticanus, because he presided over the principles of the human voice; for infants, as soon as they are born, make the sound which forms the first syllable in Vaticanus, and are therefore said vagire (to cry) which word expresses the noise which an infant first makes".

St. Augustine, who was familiar with Varro's works on ancient Roman theology, mentions this deity three times in The City of God.

Vaticanus is more likely to derive in fact from the name of an Etruscan settlement, possibly called Vatica or Vaticum, located in the general area the Romans called vaticanus ager, "Vatican territory". If such a settlement existed, however, no trace of it has been discovered. The consular fasti preserve a personal name Vaticanus in the mid-5th century BC, of unknown relation to the place name.

== Topography of ancient Rome ==
Vaticanus Mons (or Vaticanus Collis) was most often a name in Classical Latin for the Janiculum. Cicero uses the plural form Vaticani Montes in a context that seems to include the modern Vatican Hill and the Monte Mario and the Janiculan hill.

The Ager Vaticanus or Campus Vaticanus was originally a level area between the Vaticanus Mons and the Tiber. During the Republican era, it was an unwholesome site frequented by the destitute. Caligula and Nero used the area for chariot exercises, as at the Gaianum, and renewal was encouraged by the building of the Circus of Nero, also known as the Circus Vaticanus or simply the Vaticanum. The location of tombs near the Circus Vaticanus is mentioned in a few late sources.

The Vaticanum was also the site of the Phrygianum, a temple of the Magna Mater goddess Cybele. Although secondary to this deity's main worship on the Palatine Hill, this temple gained such fame in the ancient world that both Lyon, in Gaul, and Mainz, in Germany called their own Magna Mater compounds "Vaticanum" in imitation. Remnants of this structure were encountered in the Seventeenth Century reconstruction of St. Peter's Square.

Vaticanus Mons came to refer to the modern Vatican Hill as a result of calling the whole area the "Vatican" (Vaticanum). Christian usage of the name was spurred by the martyrdom of St. Peter there. Beginning in the early 4th century AD, construction began on the Old St. Peter's Basilica over a cemetery that is the traditional site of St. Peter's tomb. Around this time, the name Vaticanus Mons was established in its modern usage, and the Janiculum hill was distinguished from it as the Ianiculensis Mons.

Another cemetery nearby was opened to the public on 10 October 2006 to commemorate the 500th anniversary of the Vatican Museums.

== Christian history ==
The Vatican Hill was included within the city limits of Rome during the reign of Pope Leo IV, who, between 848 and 852, expanded the city walls to protect St. Peter's Basilica and the Vatican. Thus, Vatican Hill has been within the walls and city limits of Rome for over 1100 years. Until the Lateran Treaties in 1929 it was part of the Rione of Borgo.

Before the Avignon Papacy (1305–1378), the headquarters of the Holy See were located at the Lateran Palace. After the Avignon Papacy the church administration moved to Vatican Hill and the papal palace was (until 1871) the Quirinal Palace, upon the Quirinal Hill. Since June 1929, part of the Vatican Hill is the site of the State of the Vatican City. However, the cathedral of the Bishop of Rome, the Pope, is not St. Peter's in the Vatican, but Basilica di San Giovanni in Laterano, which is extra-territorially linked, as indicated in the Lateran Pacts signed with the Italian state in February 1929, with the Holy See.

== See also ==
- Seven hills of Rome
- Aventine Hill (Aventino)
- Caelian Hill (Celio)
- Capitoline Hill (Capitolino)
- Cispian Hill (Cispio)
- Esquiline Hill (Esquilino)
- Janiculum Hill (Gianicolo)
- Monte Mario
- Oppian Hill (Oppio)
- Palatine Hill (Palatino)
- Pincian Hill (Pincio)
- Quirinal Hill (Quirinale)
- Velian Hill (Velia)
- Viminal Hill (Viminale)
- Index of Vatican City-related articles
