= Acta Arvalia =

The Acta Arvalia were the recorded protocols of the Arval Brothers (Arvales fratres), a priestly brotherhood (sodalitas) of ancient Roman religion.

The acta were inscribed in marble tablets fastened to the walls of the Temple of Dea Dia, goddess of the grove, near the present borough of the Magliana Vecchia, between the right bank of the Tiber and the hill Monte delle Piche. The oldest of the protocols are evidence of early Latin. They are mentioned by Varro. "The transcription of the records of this priesthood onto stone provided possibly the biggest coherent complex of inscriptions of the Roman ancient world," Jörg Rüpke has observed. The datable entries span from 21 BC to 304 AD.

The acta document routine rituals and special occasions, the vota of participating members, the name of the place where sacrifices occurred, and specific dates. They are an important source for ancient Roman prosopography and a useful one for the study of Rome's distinctive archaic religious traditions. Actual liturgies are lacking: the first instance of a Latin hymn text, the famous and incomprehensibly archaic Carmen Arvale, was not entrusted to publication in a stone inscription until the beginning of the third century CE, when few could have deciphered it.

Fragments of the inscriptions were first recovered by Wilhelm Henzen, 1866-69. Further fragments subsequently came to light.

Though their rituals were conducted outside the pomerium that demarcated the official confines of the city in earliest times, the Arvales emerged from obscurity toward the end of the Roman Republic as an elite group, to judge from the status of their known members in the Augustan period.

== Indigitamenta ==
The Acta Arvalia preserve the names of four "functional goddesses" that are otherwise unknown. They were to be invoked for a piaculum, a propitiation conducted in advance of destroying a tree. Their names, having the appearance of Latin gerundives, are Adolenda (in reference to burning the tree), Commolenda (reducing it to chips), Deferunda and Coinquenda (felling the tree). They are included by W.H. Roscher among the indigitamenta, the lists of Roman deities maintained by priests to assure that the correct divinity was invoked in public rituals. What appears to be a gerundive form would be unusual, though not unique to these four deities. Most theonyms formed from verbs are active or agent nouns, indicating that the deity was thought to enable or perform the action. If the names are gerundives, they could be taken as passive, meaning that the deity received the action. Hendrik Wagenvoort thought that perhaps the names were addressed to the numen of the tree itself, trees being of feminine gender in Latin.

Two sheep were the prescribed piaculum for each goddess.
