= Partula =

Partula may refer to:

- Partula (gastropod), a genus of snails of the family Partulidae
- Partula, a Roman goddess of childbirth; see List of Roman birth and childhood deities
