= Lateranus =

Satirical ancient Roman god of hearths

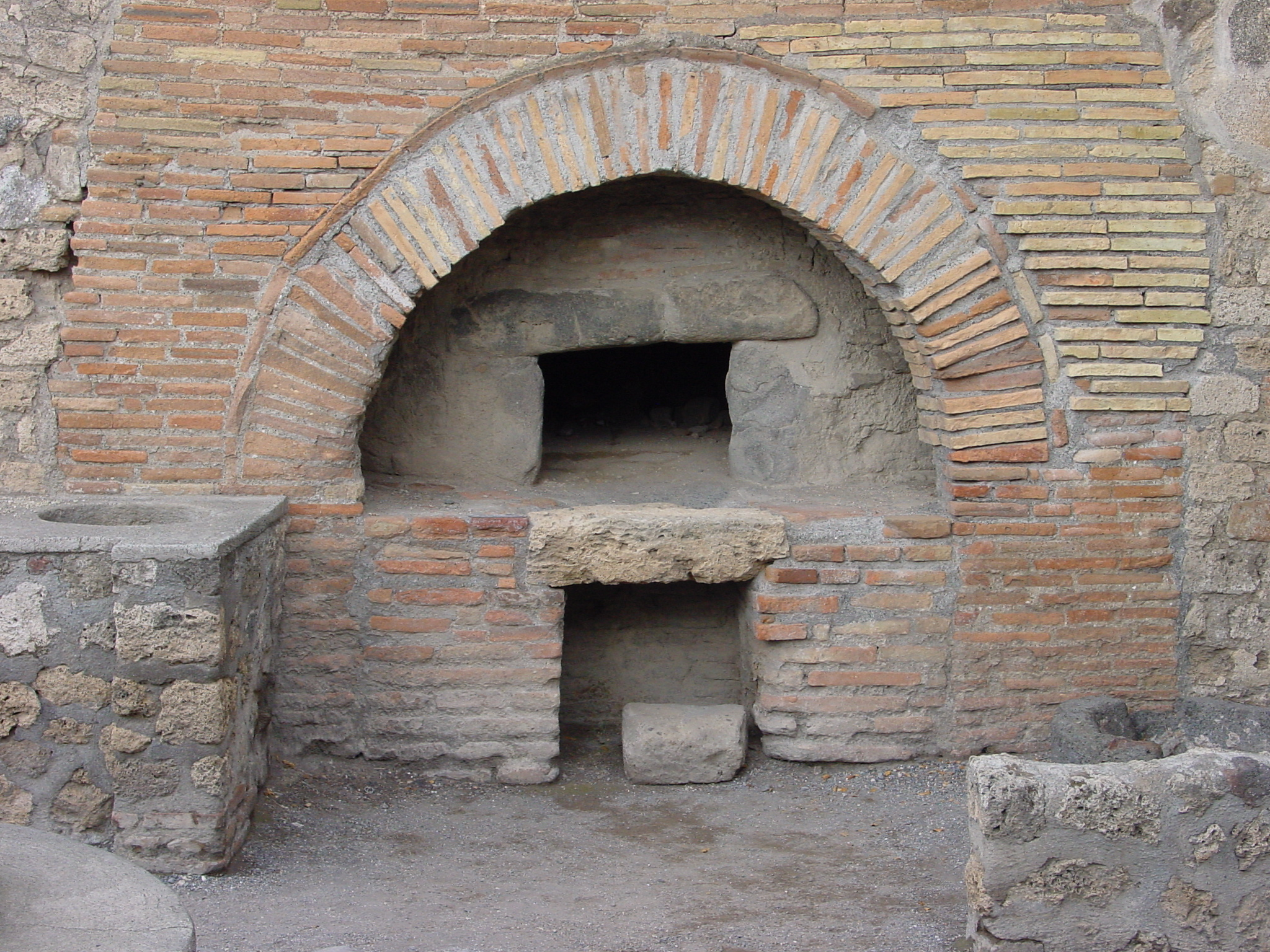
Ruin of a brick baker's oven from Pompeii

Lateranus is an ancient Roman tutelary god of hearths (foci) and a Genius of brick ovens, according to a satirical passage in the Christian writer Arnobius:

Lateranus, as you say, is the god and genius of hearths, and received this name because men build that kind of fireplace of unbaked bricks. What then? if hearths were made of baked clay, or any other material whatever, will they have no genii? and will Lateranus, whoever he is, abandon his duty as guardian, because the kingdom which he possesses has not been formed of clay? And for what purpose, I ask, has that god received the charge of hearths? He runs about the kitchens of men, examining and discovering with what kinds of wood the heat in their fires is produced; he gives strength to earthen vessels, that they may not fly in pieces, overcome by the violence of the flames; he sees that the flavour of unspoilt dainties reaches the taste of the palate with their own pleasantness, and acts the part of a taster, and tries whether the sauces have been rightly prepared.

The name Lateranus is based on the Latin stem meaning brick, later-, as in opus latericium, a type of brickwork (compare also laterculus). No other ancient writer mentions this god. W.H. Roscher places Lateranus among the indigitamenta, the list of deities maintained by Roman priests to assure that the correct divinity was invoked for rituals.

== See also ==
- Vesta, the major Roman deity who presided over the hearth
- Fornacalia, a Roman festival of ovens
- Fornax, the goddess of the Fornacalia
- Volcanus, the god of fire
