= Agenoria =

Agenoria may refer to:

- Agenoria (mythology), a minor ancient Roman goddess who promoted activity
- Agenoria (locomotive), a locomotive built by Foster, Rastrick and Company
