= Nenia Dea =

Nenia Dea (Engl.: Goddess Nenia; rarely Naenia) was an ancient funeral deity of Rome, who had a sanctuary outside the Porta Viminalis. The cult of Nenia is doubtless a very old one, but according to Georg Wissowa the location of Nenia's shrine (sacellum) outside the center of early Rome indicates that she didn't belong to the earliest circle of Roman deities. In a different interpretation her shrine was located outside the old city walls, because it had been the custom for all gods connected to death or dying.

== Goddess of the Roman funerary lament ==
Nenia shares her name with the nenia that sometimes took the meaning of carmen funebre ("dirge"), and Marcus Terentius Varro regarded the Nenia Dea as a personification of the funerary lament's protective power. She was therefore a goddess also connected to the end of a person's life. Varro assigned the Nenia Dea to a polar position with respect to the god Ianus, which was probably inspired by one of the ancient Roman etymologies of the word nenia, defining it as nenia finis ("end", fig.: "finale").

Arnobius places men who are near to death under Nenia's care. Although Arnobius' writings are mainly influenced by Cornelius Labeo, the identification of Nenia as the goddess of human transience here also suggests a Varronian origin. It is unclear whether Tertullian referred to the Nenia Dea when he wrote about the "goddess of death herself". Whether the worship of Nenia herself was part of the last rites is uncertain. However, Lucius Afranius clearly associates the term nenia (i.e. the funeral song) with the obsequies.

== Further hypotheses ==
Heller rejects Nenia's status as a funerary deity and makes a guess as to her original nature as the goddess of "children's playtime". Heller's restrictive emphasis on nenia as a "jingle" or "plaything" alone has however been refuted, since sufficient sources on the funerary nature have been delivered by Heller himself, albeit disregarded.

In any case, even Heller's erroneous interpretation of the term nenia could in principle be applicable to Roman funerary customs, because death was also seen as a rebirth into the afterlife. Lucretius explicitly connects the funeral lamentations with the "wail that children raise upon first seeing the shores of light." Furthermore, the dirges could sometimes also have paralleled the lullabies that mothers sing to their children, since some neniae were sung with a soothing voice. However, this source and other sources on the nenia as a lullaby do not specifically refer to dirges, but to neniae in general. Beside the lament to fend off perdition, Nenia's character might have included some of the hypothesized philosophies, e.g. the wailing of rebirth, but since the sources are silent with respect to the goddess herself, these views on the Nenia Dea remain speculation.

== See also ==
- Roman mythology
- Religion in ancient Rome
- Ianus, the Roman god
- Di inferi, the underworld gods as a collective
- List of Roman birth and childhood deities
