= Molae =

The Molae are goddesses who appear in an ancient Roman prayer formula in connection with Mars. The list of invocations given by Aulus Gellius pairs a god's name (given in the genitive case) with a feminine nominative noun that personifies a quality or power of the god (Moles Martis, "Moles of Mars"). These pairings are often taken as "marriages" in the anthropomorphic mythological tradition. An inscription records a supplicatio Molibus Martis, supplication for the Moles of Mars.

The name Mola (plural Molae) would refer to a goddess of the mill, as in mola salsa, the ritual substance prepared by the Vestals from flour and salt, but the connection with war or Mars would be unclear, though perhaps conceptually related to Iuppiter Pistor, "Jupiter the Miller". W.H. Roscher includes Mola among the indigitamenta, the list of deities maintained by Roman priests to assure that the correct divinity was invoked for rituals.
