= Helernus =

Archaic Roman deity

Helernus, also known as Alernus, was an Archaic Roman deity. Very little is known of this god; not even his name is fully certain. In some manuscripts of Ovid, he is recorded with either the name Avernus or Alernus, which later scholars emended to Helernus. The classicist Georg Wissowa etymologically connected his name to holus, holeris ("vegetable") and considered him a god of vegetables. Similarly, the philologist and historian Georges Dumézil, however, argued that the deity instead had a connection to the sowing of vegetables and grains, as he was celebrated on 1 February and related to Carna, who was herself associated with agrarian concepts. However, the classicist Gary Forsythe has criticized these attempted edits, arguing that they are exclusively the result of later scholarly speculation and not premised upon what is directly attested in the ancient sources. Forsythe instead connects the god to a passage from the works of the 2nd-century CE grammarian Sextus Pompeius Festus, who describes a sacrifice of a black ox to a god called Aeterno, the name of whom has been emended to Aternus due to a comparison with the Latin word ater ("black").

His sacred grove (lucus) was near the mouth of the Tiber river. He had one daughter, named Carna, who was goddess of protecting the intestines of children from vampires. Sacrifices were made to him annually on 1 February by the Roman Pontiffs, in which a black ox was killed. The particular choice of a black ox as the sacrificial animal perhaps implies that he was a minor chthonic deity as only gods of the underworld were given black animals as sacrifice. Moreover, Poultney and others compare Helernus with the potentially chthonic deity Hule/Horse/Huřie who shows up a couple times in the Umbrian Iguvine Tablets.
