= Agenoria (mythology) =

Roman goddess of activity

Agenoria is a Roman goddess of activity (actus). Her name is presumably derived from the Latin verb agō, "to do, drive, go"; present participle agēns. She is named only by Augustine of Hippo, who places her among the deities who are concerned with childhood. She is thus one of the goddesses who endows the child with a developmental capacity, such as walking, singing, reasoning, and learning to count. W.H. Roscher includes Agenoria among the indigitamenta, the list of deities maintained by Roman priests to assure that the correct divinity was invoked for rituals.

== Renaissance allegory ==
Despite her obscurity, Agenoria is the title character of the first of four Latin apologues written in 1497 by the Italian humanist Pandolfo Collenuccio in honor of Ercole II d'Este, duke of Ferrara. The allegorical fiction Agenoria, influenced by Lucian, begins with the betrothal of Inertia (Inactivity) to Labor, whose wedding gifts such as farm animals and sweat result in a breakup. Labor then weds Agenoria (Activity). Their wedding is attended by a number of other personifications, including Ubertas (Abundance) and Voluptas (Pleasure), whose presence arouses the violence of Inertia and her followers. The defeat of the virtuous company of Agenoria and Labor is prevented only by the deus ex machina intervention of Jupiter. One of the wedding guests, Politia (Civilization) then praises the contributions to human society made by Labor, Agenoria, and the other attendant virtues. Jupiter asserts that Agenoria is under his divine protection.

== See also ==
- List of Roman birth and childhood deities
- Agenoria, an early British steam locomotive of 1829
