= Lucina (mythology) =

Roman goddess of childbirth

In ancient Roman religion, Lucina was a title or epithet given to the goddess Juno, and sometimes to Diana, in their roles as goddesses of childbirth who safeguarded the lives of women in labor.

The title lucina (from the Latin lux, lucis, "light") links both Juno and Diana to the light of the Moon, the cycles of which were used to track female fertility as well as measure the duration of a pregnancy. Priests of Juno called her by the epithet Juno Covella on the new moon. The title might alternatively have been derived from lucus ("grove") after a sacred grove of lotus trees on the Esquiline Hill associated with Juno, later the site of her temple.

Juno Lucina was chief among a number of deities who influenced or guided every aspect of birth and child development, such as Vagitanus, who opened the newborn's mouth to cry, and Fabulinus, who enabled the child's first articulate speech. The collective di nixi were birth goddesses, and had an altar in the Campus Martius.

The asteroid 146 Lucina and the extinct species of ostracod Luprisca incuba are named after this aspect of the goddess.

== See also ==
- List of Roman birth and childhood deities
