= Temple of Juno Lucina =

375 BC Roman temple

The Temple of Juno Lucina (Latin: Aedes Iunonis Lucinae) was a Roman temple dedicated to Juno Lucina (goddess of women in childbirth) on the Esquiline Hill in Rome. It was dedicated on 1 March 375 BC, the festival of the Matronalia. Before its construction, the cult of Juno Lucina occurred in a sacred grove or lucus (possibly the origin of the epithet Lucina) on the site - Varro dates the cult's origin to Titus Tatius, king of the Sabines. It was struck by lightning in 190 BC, damaging the tympanum and doorway. In 41 BC the quaestor Quintus Pedius built or rebuilt a wall possibly dating back to the sacred grove. It was still operational in the imperial period, as attested to in inscriptions.

== See also ==
- List of Ancient Roman temples

== Sources ==
- Aedes Junonis Lucinae
