= Roscher =

Roscher is a German surname. People with the name include:

- Wilhelm Georg Friedrich Roscher (1817–1894), German economist
- His son Wilhelm Heinrich Roscher (1845–1923), German classical scholar
- Alfred Roscher (born 1959), Austrian footballer
- Albrecht Roscher (1836–1860), German explorer
