= Rumina =

Roman goddess of breastfeeding

In ancient Roman religion, Rumīna, Rumilia or Rumia, also known as Dīva Rumīna, was a goddess who protected breastfeeding mothers, and possibly nursing infants. Her domain extended to protecting animal mothers, not just human ones. As one of the indigitamenta, Rumina lacked the elaborate mythology and personality of later Roman deities, and was instead a more abstract, numinous entity.

Rumina's temple was near the Ficus Ruminalis, the fig tree at the foot of the Palatine Hill where Romulus and Remus were raised by a she-wolf. Milk, rather than the typical wine, was offered as a sacrifice at this temple. In AD 58, the tree started to die, which was interpreted as a bad omen.

== See also ==
- Lupercalia
