= August Reifferscheid =

German archaeologist and classical philologist

Karl Wilhelm August Reifferscheid (3 October 1835 – 10 November 1887) was a German archaeologist and classical philologist.

== Biography ==
He was born and educated in Bonn. He received a traveling fellowship in archaeology from the University of Bonn, and spent 1861–66 mostly in Italy, part of the time fulfilling a request by the Vienna Academy to do archival research for the Corpus Scriptorum Ecclesiasticorum Latinorum. He was professor at Breslau (1868–85), and beginning in 1885, a professor at the University of Strassburg (Kaiser-Wilhelm-Universität).

Reifferscheid died in Strassburg, Alsace-Lorraine.

== Works ==
His works include:

- Suetoni præter Cæsarum Libros Reliquiæ (1860); the standard edition of these fragments.
- Bibliotheca Patrum Latinorum Italica (2 volumes, 1865–72).
- Arnobii Adversvs nationes libri VII (1875); main author, Arnobius.
- An edition of Anna Comnena's Alexiad (1878).
- A partial edition of Tertullian, Quinti Septimi Florentis Tertulliani (edited by Georg Wissowa, 1890).
