= Vagitanus =

Childbirth deity in ancient Roman religion

In ancient Roman religion, Vagitanus or Vaticanus was one of a number of childbirth deities who influenced or guided some aspect of parturition, in this instance the newborn's crying. Some sources relate it to the Latin noun vagitus, "crying, squalling, wailing," particularly by a baby or an animal, and the verb vagio, vagire. Vagitanus has thus been described as the god "who presided over the beginning of human speech," but a distinction should be made between the first cry and the first instance of articulate speech, in regard to which Fabulinus (fari, "to speak"; cf. fabula) was the deity to invoke. Vagitanus has been connected to a remark by Pliny that only a human being is thrown naked onto the naked earth on his day of birth for immediate wails (vagitus) and weeping.

== Name ==
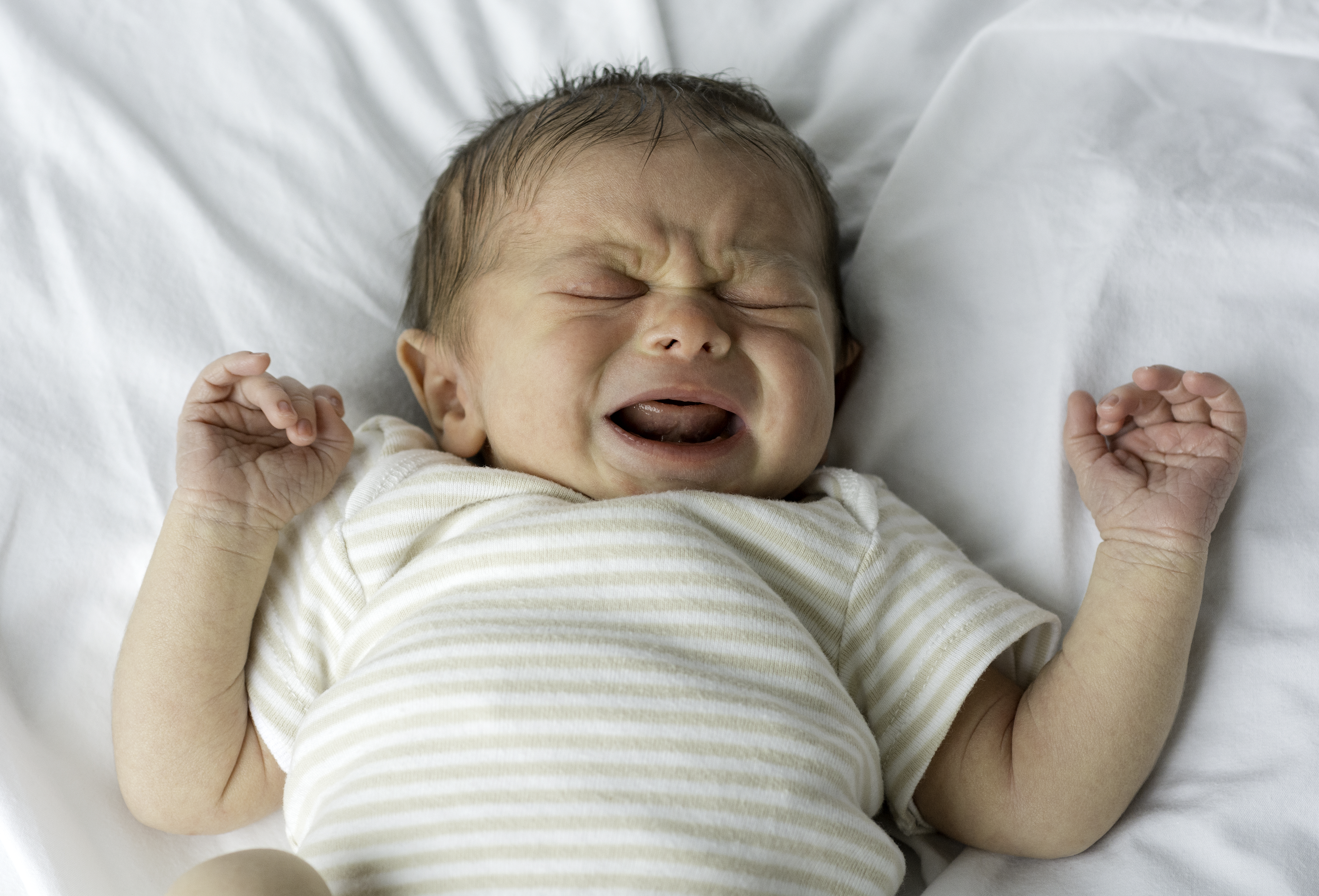
In ancient Rome, Vagitanus or Vaticanus was invoked as the god who opened the newborn's mouth to wail; the first syllable of his name, pronounced wa in Classical Latin, was thought to be onomatopoeic

The "divine functionaries" (German Sondergötter) whose names express their sphere of influence are considered characteristic of Indo-European religions. The name Vaticanus was discussed by various ancient authors. The name Vaticanus in connection to vagitus is discussed by Aulus Gellius and Augustine of Hippo. Gellius quotes Varro, who is generally acknowledged also as Augustine's main source on ancient Roman theology:

We have been told that the word Vatican is applied to the hill, and the deity who presides over it, from the vaticinia, or prophecies, which took place there by the power and inspiration of the god; but Marcus Varro, in his book on Divine Things, gives another reason for this name. "As Aius," says he, "was called a deity, and an altar was built to his honour in the lowest part of the new road, because in that place a voice from heaven was heard, so this deity was called Vaticanus, because he presided over the principles of the human voice; for infants, as soon as they are born, make the sound which forms the first syllable in Vaticanus, and are therefore said vagire (to cry) which word expresses the noise which an infant first makes.

Despite the insistence on an etymological connection between the god's name and vagitus, Gronovius thought the correct form should be Vaticanus, and that Vagitanus was Vulgar Latin rather than classical. Augustine mentions Vagitanus/Vaticanus three times in Book 4 On the City of God in deriding the "mob" of Roman gods (turba deorum). In demonstrating that the names of gods reveal their function, he points to Vaticanus, "who presides over the cries (vagitibus) of infants," noting elsewhere that among the many deities associated with childbirth, Vaticanus is the one who opens the mouth of the newborn in crying (in vagitu).

== See also ==
- Eileithyia
- Di nixi
- List of Roman birth and childhood deities
