= Fabulinus =

In the popular religion of ancient Rome, though not appearing in literary Roman mythology, the god Fabulinus (from fabulari, to speak) taught children to speak. He received an offering when the child spoke its first words. He figured among what Walter Pater enumerated in Marius the Epicurean (1885) among:

the names of that populace of 'little gods', dear to the Roman home, which the pontiffs had placed on the sacred list of the Indigitamenta, to be invoked, because they can help, on special occasions, were not forgotten in the long litany— Vatican who causes the infant to utter his first cry, Fabulinus who prompts his first word, Cuba who keeps him quiet in his cot, Domiduca especially, for whom Marius had through life a particular memory and devotion, the goddess who watches over one's safe coming home".

== See also ==
- List of Roman birth and childhood deities
