= Dei Lucrii =

The dii lucrii or dei lucrii are a collective of Roman deities mentioned by the Christian apologist Arnobius (d. 330 AD):

"Indeed, who is there who would believe that there are gods of profit, and that they preside over the pursuit of profits, which come most of the time from base sources and always at the expense of others?"

== See also ==
- Mercury (mythology)
