= Verminus =

Roman god

In Roman mythology, Verminus was the Roman god who protected cattle from disease. The god may have been inherited from the Indigetes, whom the Romans conquered in 218 BC during the Roman conquest of Hispania. An altar dedicated by consul (or duovir) Aulus Postumius Albinus in 151 BC to Verminus was discovered in 1876, and was housed in the museum of the Antiquarium Comunale in Rome.

A 2nd century inscription dedicated to the god has been considered to be a reaction to increased worm infections among humans. However, Spanish veterinary scientist M. Cordero del Campillo has concluded that it was due to an epidemic infectious disease affecting both humans and animals.

An altar to Verminus was discovered on Viminal Hill in Rome.
