= Aius Locutius =

Roman deity

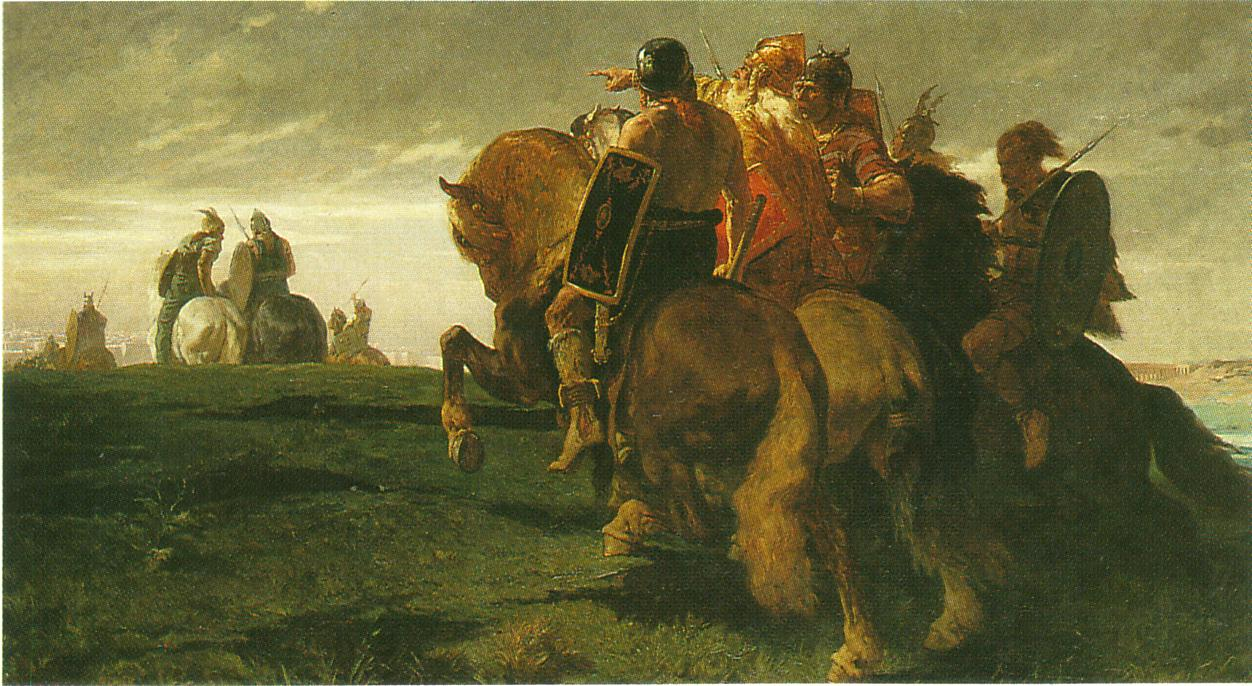
Artistic interpretation of the Gauls approaching Rome by Evariste-Vital Luminous.

Aius Locutius (from aio 'to say' and loquor 'to speak'), or Aius Loquens, was a Roman deity or numen associated with the Gallic invasions of Rome during the early 4th century BC.

According to legend, a Roman plebeian named M. Caedicius heard a supernatural, nocturnal voice that issued from Vesta's sacred grove, at the base of the Palatine Hill. It warned him of an imminent Gaulish attack, recommended that the walls of Rome be fortified and instructed him to pass these messages on to the tribune of the plebs, but because of the messenger's humble station, the message was ignored. In consequence, the Gauls entered and burned the city (c. 390 BC). Once the Gauls were repelled, the Senate built a temple and altar (known as Ara Aius Locutius or Ara Saepta) to propitiate the unknown deity who had offered the warning. This was said to have been set up where Caedicius had heard the divine voice. Later Roman historians disputed its exact location and no trace remains of the temple or altar; the latter has been historically misidentified with the Palatine altar inscribed si deus si dea ("whether god or goddess"), in cautious dedication to some unknown deity.

In the broad context of official Roman religion, Aius Locutius is exceptional. Officially, the gods might speak through the cryptic writings and utterances of specialised oracles, or through a complex system of signs in answer to the specific questions of State augurs. They might also grant signs of fortune to their most favoured protégés, or speak privately to them in dreams. Aius Locutius gave clear, urgent instructions of great importance to the State, in a voice "clearer than human", but in everyday Latin, to an ordinary plebeian passer-by. Thereafter, according to Cicero, "having acquired a temple, an altar, and a name, 'Speaker' never spoke again". As a trained augur, Cicero was obliged to successfully identify and expiate any prodigies, including such "divine noise" that might signal imminent disaster or divine discontent. Beard (2012) places Aius Locutius at the "extraordinary limit" of such sounds, for the unequivocal clarity of the warning, and the consequences of its rejection by Roman authorities; a god "defined by his voice alone".

The epithet Locutius was also used to invoke one of the deities concerned with child development. Etymologically, the name Aius Locutius has been connected to Umbrian Ahtu, the name of two divine entities with the Iguvine tablets.
