= Rediculus =

Ancient Roman divinity

Rediculus is an ancient Roman divinity. His cult had a temple near the Porta Capena, and a campus on the Appian Way.

== Origins and nature ==
This divinity is probably one of Rome's lares, a protector-god of the city. He is said to have appeared to Hannibal as he was camped outside Rome in 211 B.C., urging him to return (redire) to Carthage. Festus' account of the incident reports that Hannibal, nearing the city, saw apparitions in the air, filling him with dread and causing him to turn back immediately:

Rediculi fanum extra portam Capenam fuit, quia accedens ad Urbem Hannibal ex eo loco redierit quibusdam perterritus visis.

The [temple] of Rediculus was [outside] the Porta Capena; it was so called because Hannibal, when on the march from Capua, turned back at that spot, being alarmed at certain portentous visions.

One account has the god's entreaty taking the form of a shower of hail. After Hannibal's retreat, the Romans erected an altar at the site to "Rediculus Tutanus", the god "who turned back and protected".

Others derive the name of the god from the word ridiculus, signifying a thing to be laughed at. Hannibal's failure to enter Rome made him an object of scorn for the Romans, and in order to perpetuate his shame, they erected a temple to the god of laughter. Varro gives the god the epithet Tutanus (protector), having him speak in his Saturae Menippeae (Hercules tuam fidem, XXXIX):

Noctu Hannibalis cum fugavi exercitum,
Tutanus hoc, Tutanus Romae nuncupor.
Hoc propter omnes, qui laborant, invocant.

When in the night great Hannibal I beat,
And forc'd his troops from Latium to retreat,
From my defense, Tutanus was my name:
By this the wretched my protection claim.

Other authors, such as Robert Burn, say that this legend is "altogether unworthy of credit". Travelers leaving the city would pray at the temple before embarking on the Appian Way.

== Temple and campus ==
A monument in the Parco della Caffarella is often mistakenly labelled as the Temple of Deus Rediculus and also confused with the Cenotaph of Regilla; the temple, however, is described by Pliny as having been on the opposite side of the Appian Way. The temple was dedicated in about AD 65.

There was a tomb in the campus Rediculi (English: field of Rediculus) dedicated to a talking crow. Pliny the Elder gives the story in his Natural History (Book X, chapter 60): A cobbler had a stall in the Roman Forum and possessed a tame crow who, being a favorite among the younger Romans, eventually became a sort of public character. When it was killed by a rival of the cobbler, they executed the rival and gave the bird a public funeral, carrying it on a bier to its burial place in the field of Rediculus.
