= Spiniensis =

Roman god of thorns

In Roman mythology, Spiniensis was the god of thorns. People prayed to him when they removed thorny plants from their fields as he presided over the digging out of thorn bushes and guarded the field against thorns. His name comes from spina ("spine/thorn").
