= Domiduca =

In Roman mythology, the goddess Domiduca protects children on the way back to their parents' home. Her male counterpart was Domitius, Domidius or Domiducus, from domus, "house," and eo, ire, itum, "to go."

Domiduca and Domiducus were also marriage gods who accompanied the bridal procession as the couple arrived at their new home together on the wedding night. The names occur as epithets of Jupiter and Juno. When the bride has been led home, "the god Domitius is employed to install her in her house."

== See also ==
- List of Roman birth and childhood deities
