= Georg Wissowa =

German classical philologist (1859-1931)

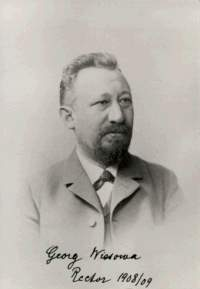
Georg Wissowa (1859-1931)

Georg Otto August Wissowa (17 June 1859 – 11 May 1931) was a German classical philologist born in Neudorf, near Breslau.

== Education and career ==
Wissowa studied classical philology under August Reifferscheid at the University of Breslau from 1876 to 1880, then furthered his studies at the Ludwig-Maximilians-Universität München under Heinrich Brunn, a leading authority on Roman antiquities. Having obtained his habilitation at the University of Breslau in 1882, he received a travel scholarship from the German Archaeological Institute and went to Italy for a year. After that he taught as Privatdozent at the University of Breslau from 1883 to 1886, when he accepted a chair at Marburg University (as professor extraordinarius) where he was awarded a full professorship in 1890. In 1895, he relocated to Halle as a successor to Heinrich Keil. After suffering two severe strokes in 1923, he was retired in 1924.

== Works ==
Georg Wissowa is remembered today for re-edition of Realencyclopädie der Classischen Altertumswissenschaft, an encyclopedia of classical studies initially started by August Friedrich Pauly (1796–1845) in 1837. Around 1890, Wissowa began the new edition, an ambitious project that he anticipated would take ten years to finish. However, it wouldn't be until the 1970s that the last of its 83 volumes was published.

He was the author of a significant work on ancient Roman religion, titled Religion und Kultus der Römer (1902), which appeared also in a second revised edition (1912), a book in which he explored the development of Roman religion, and in the process, provided a comprehensive description of its deities and religious practices. Wissowa also published a revision of Ludwig Friedländer's moral history of Rome called Darstellungen aus der Sittengeschichte Roms, worked on Wilhelm Heinrich Roscher's encyclopedia of Greek and Roman mythology, Ausführliches Lexikon der griechischen und römischen Mythologie" and edited the second edition of Joachim Marquardt's "Römische Staatsverwaltung, vol. III. (1885).
