= Numen =

Ancient Roman divine presence

Numen (plural numina) is a Latin term for "divinity", "divine presence", or "divine will". The Latin authors defined it as follows: Cicero writes of a "divine mind" (divina mens), a god "whose numen everything obeys", and a "divine power" (vis divina) "which pervades the lives of men". It causes the motions and cries of birds during augury. In Virgil's recounting of the blinding of the one-eyed giant, Polyphemus, from the Odyssey, in his Aeneid, he has Odysseus and his men first "ask for the assistance of the great numina" (magna precati numina). Reviewing public opinion of Augustus on the day of his funeral, the historian Tacitus reports that some thought "no honor was left to the gods" when he "established the cult of himself" (se ... coli vellet) "with temples and the effigies of numina" (effigie numinum). Pliny the Younger in a letter to Paternus raves about the "power", the "dignity", and "the majesty"; in short, the "numen of history". Lucretius uses the expression numen mentis, or "bidding of the mind", where "bidding" is numen, not, however, the divine numen, unless the mind is to be considered divine, but as simply human will.

Since the early 20th century, numen has sometimes been compared with mana and treated as a remnant of a pre-animistic phase; that is, a belief system inherited from an earlier time. However, these ideas are now largely rejected within the scholarly literature. Numen is also used by sociologists to refer to the idea of magical power residing in an object, particularly when writing about ideas in the Western tradition.

== Etymology and origin ==
The 1st-century BCE Roman author Varro records that the term numen derives from nutus ("nod, command, will"), and, similarly, the 2nd-century grammarian Festus defines numen as the "nutus dei ac potestas" ("the command and power of a god"). Michiel de Vaan, an Indo-Europeanist scholar, derives the term from the verb -nuō ("to nod") also underlying nutus. If this proposal is accepted, the term is connected with the Proto-Indo-European root *new- ("to nod"), whence also Ancient Greek νεύω ("neúō," "to nod"). On the basis of its etymology, the classical scholar H. J. Rose provides the following definition of numen:

The literal meaning is simply "a nod", or more accurately, for it is a passive formation, "that which is produced by nodding", just as flamen is "that which is produced by blowing", i.e., a gust of wind. It came to mean "the product or expression of power" — not, be it noted, power itself.

Thus, numen ("divinity") is not personified (although it can be a personal attribute) and should be distinguished from deus ("god").

According to the classicist Kurt Latte, the term numen is first attested in the works of Accius and Gaius Lucilius, which date to the second half of the 2nd-century BCE. It is, however, unattested in earlier writings, such as the works of Plautus, Ennius, or Cato the Elder, and it is also absent from ancient religious texts. On this basis, Latte proposed that—due to the influence of Stoic philosophy—the term may have emerged as a translation of Ancient Greek δύναμις ("dúnamis"). However, the classicist Tamás Nótári argues that the lack of proper attestation in the works of Ennius and Cato is perhaps attributable to the incomplete state of their surviving writings and it also the comedic plays of Plautus were inherently incongruent with esoteric religious concepts. Moreover, as noted by Latte himself, it is impossible to explains why the specific word numen would be generated to translate the Greek term.

The historian Rebecca Denova has proposed that the concept of the numen parallels concepts known from Etruscan culture, where the divine was often envisioned as a vague and amorphous force. According to the Etruscologist Lammert Bouke van der Meer, the term numen is the semantic equivalent of the Etruscan word flere, which is also attributed to gods, such as in the phrase flere nethunsl ("flere of Nethuns"). However, the Etruscan conceptualization of their deities as abstract forces does not necessarily align with the archaic Roman understanding of numen, which itself most likely never denoted any animistic entities. Moreover, the exact meaning of Etruscan flere is itself not undisputed—there is also evidence that it is actually better equated with Latin fons ("spring, fountain").

== Imperial cult of the numina ==
Within the Imperial cult, the term numen perhaps referred to the divine power of a living emperor—in other words, it may have functioned as a means of worshiping a living emperor without literally calling him a god. Whereas the emperor possessed numen, they were not necessarily a numen themselves—Pliny the Younger, a 1st-century CE Roman author, explicitly warns against referring to the emperor as such, writing ("Nowhere should we flatter him [Domitian] as a god or as a numen" ("nusquam ut deo, nusquam ut numini blandiamur"). According to the classicist Duncan Fishwick, the attribution of numen to the emperor likely represented a declaration that they served as a mediator between the divine and humanity, fulfilling a role comparable to the Ancient Greek theios aner. The classicist J. C. Mann argues that, if numen is understood to mean something akin to "divine power," it is unclear how it could be attributed to a living emperor, given that Roman citizens were barred from worshipping the emperor as a god. Mann argues that it was not the emperor personally, but their enormous political power, including the ability to impose regulations on the worship of certain deities, which accorded them numen. Mann also suggests that worship of the imperial numen proliferated amongst the peregrini, who were perhaps more willing to ascribe divinity to the emperor.

One inscription from the Forum Clodii describes a series of animal sacrifices performed for Augustus and his stepson Tiberius at an altar dedicated to the numen of Augustus. The text only specifies the animal sacrificed in honor Tiberius, for whom a bull-calf ("vitulus") was slaughtered, though the classicist Ittai Gradel suggests that it is likely that steers were offered for Augustus, as the dedication of adult animals for the father and calves for the son would be congruent with the Roman tendency to match some aspect of the sacrificial animal with the characteristics of the recipient. If this theory were accepted, it would imply that Augustus and Tiberius themselves were the beneficiaries of the sacrifice and not the numen, which—Gradel argues—is perfectly reasonable, as, given that all animals are either male or female, none were fit for sacrifice to the numen, a neuter entity.

Gradel ultimately suggests that worship of the emperor's numen was fundamentally synonymous with worship of the emperor personally, citing the aforementioned passage wherein Caligula built a temple honoring his "own numen," as this temple is otherwise described by Cassius Dio and Josephus as merely a temple to Caligula personally. Moreover, there are examples wherein dedications to the imperial numen were surrounded by statues depicting the imperial family, such as one inscription dated to 160 CE from Ostia, which propitiates the numen of the domus Augusta ("Augustan house," I. e. imperial family), and is also situated near a bust depicting Lucius Verus. Additional evidence perhaps derives from a section of the Fasti Praenestini that reads "Holiday by decree of the Senate, because on this day Tiberius Caesar dedicated the altar to his father Divus Augustus." This passage may indicate that worship of the alter of the numen Augustus was synonymous with worship of the emperor directly. However, Gradel concedes that this text is a later addition to the Fasti Praenestini, not a snippet of the original version composed by Verrius Flaccus. Gradel suggests that, in the particular Praenestine community whence came this rendition of the calendar, the local authorities perhaps mistakenly assumed that a holiday was fashioned for this date, which was January 17, on account of their local ritual, rather than the actual reason, which was probably the marriage of Augustus to Livia on that same date.

Fishwick argues that, in certain circumstances, the emperor's numen was identical with their genius. In support of this theory, he notes a passage from the 1st-century BCE poet Horace, who describes the swearing of altars specifically for swearing oaths in the name of the numen of Augustus, which may parallel a similar practice wherein oaths were taken by the genius of the emperor. Yet, there are other instances where the two concepts are clearly distinct. For instance, certain texts record simultaneous dedications to the genius and numen of a single individual, such as one inscription from Aquincum dated to 138 CE, which reads "to the Augustan numen and the genius of Emperor Caesar Titus Aelius Hadrianus Antoninus" ("Numini Aug(usto) et / Genio Imp(eratoris) Caes(aris) T(iti) Ae[l(i)] / Hadr(iani) Antonini"). Moreover, a stone from Narbo records a dedication on behalf of an imperial cult wherein the genii of the emperors Augustus and Tiberius are invited to the altar of the numen of Augustus, thereby implying that these genii and the numen were separate entities.

=== Dedicatory inscriptions ===
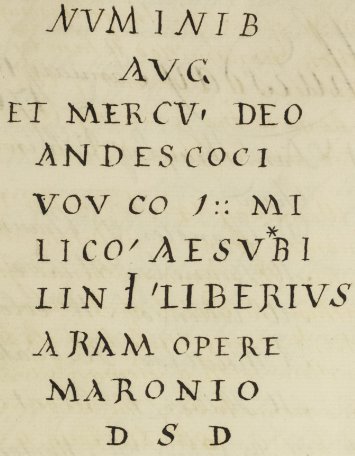
Drawing of the now lost inscription honoring the imperial numina and Mercury Andescociuoucos

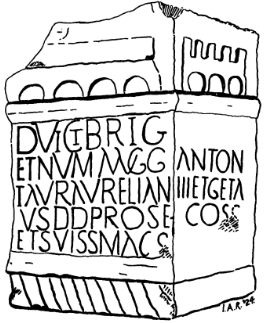
Roman inscription from Greetland containing the abbreviation AV͡VAGG.

Inscriptions referencing the imperial numen appear primarily in the northwestern portions of the empire, such as Narbonensis and the formerly Celtic provinces as a whole. In Roman Britain, worship of the imperial numina exists even among individuals that likely had not yet been extensively Romanized, sometimes within inscriptions that include deities of Celtic origin. For instance, one inscription from Camulodunum dedicated by a freedman named Imilico honors the imperial numina and a deity named Mercury Andescociuoucus. Most dedications to the imperial numina utilize the plural form numinibus, though, in Roman Africa, where dedications to the numina are generally rare, they primarily attest to the formula numini Augustorum ("to the numen of the Augusti"). According to Mann, the prevalence of the plural form in dedications probably reflects Celtic cultural influence, as the Celts worshipped other deities as pluralities, such the triple-goddess Coventina. Dedications to the numina are also infrequent in the eastern and northeastern sections of the empire, and the few surviving inscriptions primarily utilize the formula "devotus numini maiestati eius/eorum," which is itself first attested in the early third century CE. Similarly, Spain provides limited evidence for direct dedication to the numen, yet it does provide a plethora of examples of the aforementioned devotus formula.

Dedications to the imperial numina did not refer to any specific emperor, with the exception of Caligula, who supposedly—according to the 1st-century CE Roman historian Suetonius—built a temple honoring his "own numen" ("numini suo"). Yet, according to the classicist Christophe Goddard, this specific incident is likely intended to represent a breach of Roman custom, and thus it ultimately further proves the otherwise generic nature of the numina. Following the early years of the empire, the applicability of numen broadened to include the entire imperial family. Dedications from this time mention the entire Imperial household, such as one inscription dated to 55 CE from a balneum in Coela is directed towards the "numen of the house of Augustus" ("numini domus Augustae").

In general, during the reign of Augustus, inscriptions—including those that do not mention numina—often avoided abbreviating the term Augustus; it was usually rendered in full as Augustus, Augusto. or Augusti. Over time, as imperial titles became longer, the abbreviated forms also became more common. Certain inscriptions abbreviate the plural Augustorum to Augg. or Auggg, wherein the double or triple three most likely represents a dedication to the numina multiple reigning emperors. For instance, one Roman inscription from Greetland dated to 208 CE is directed towards the "NUM. AV͡VAGG," which perhaps refers to the reigning emperors Severus and Caracalla. The meaning of the abbreviation Aug.—in the context of the imperial numina—is unclear, though the RIB suggests that it referred specifically to the numina of the deceased emperors treated collectively. However, according to Fishwick, there is no other corresponding evidence from the Celtic provinces indicating any worship of deified past emperors to the exclusion of the current living rulers. Fishwick further suggests that the particular worship of the numina of deceased emperors would constitute an implicit challenge to the legitimacy of the current ruler, which would render the practice politically irresponsible and therefore conflict with the ultimate purpose of the imperial cult as a political tool of the emperors.

Fishwick instead argues that title Augustorum actually, designates both the living and the deceased emperors, citing certain inscriptions where the term is explicitly associated with a living emperor. For example, one inscription dated to 190 CE discovered at Lugdunum that mentions the numinibus Augusti also, since it is a taurobolium, most likely began with a pro salute ("for welfare") formula, in which case the text most likely referred to the living emperor, as it would be redundant to pray for the welfare of the deceased. Additionally, the inscription also references the whole "divine household" ("domus divinae"), which implies reference to a specific member of the imperial family. Furthermore, Fishwick cites other instances of the term Augustorum where it may denote both present and past rulers, such as in the title of the flamen Romae et Augustorum ("priest of Rome and of the Augusti""). Since the term Roma ("Rome") is usually associated with the living emperor, presumably this priestly title included the current ruler of the empire. Moreover, in the particular case of this flamen—according to Fishwick—it is impossible that the term Augustorum could have denoted multiple concurrent emperors given the date of the text and it is unlikely that it refers to several successive rulers given that the provincial priest would only have served for one year.

According to Mann, however, it is completely impossible that the sequence numinibus Aug. usually refers to multiple, arguing that it would violate the known customs of Roman epigraphic convention. Mann notes that there are examples of the form Aug. referencing multiple emperors: One inscription dated to 164 CE from Aquincum contains the sequence "duorum Aug." ("of the two Augusti"), though this inscription does not mention the imperial numina. However, after 161 CE, a year when two co-emperors assumed the throne, the abbreviations Augg. or Auggg became increasingly popular as the standard means to denote multiple emperors. Mann argues that it is unreasonable to suppose that an ancient Roman stonecutter would spontaneously violate epigraphic standards specifically when the text pertained to the numina. Mann also suggests that the abbreviation Aug. could not include dead emperors, as other inscriptions attest to an epigraphic tendency to distinguish between the emperors that were and were not deified.

Fishwick, in contrast, argues that the sequence numinibus Aug. must be expanded, in every instance, to the plural numinibus Aug(ustorum). According to Fishwick, Roman customs mandated that an individual emperor or god can only possess one numen. For example, one 1st-century CE inscription from Ipagrum is dedicated to the singular numini of emperor Tiberius. There are examples of multiple numina being attributed to one specific deity, though all of these examples are poetic and perhaps result from the metrical needs of the writing. Moreover, there are also instances wherein one numen is attributed to a collection of deities, such as one 2nd-century CE inscription from Valle de Abdalajís which reads "numini divorum Augg(ustorum)" ("to the numen of the divine Augusti"). Fishwick suggests that the specific rules varied across each province. In Roman Africa, the formula numini Augustorum was more common, whereas in Gaul, Germania, and Britain, the variant numinibus Augustorum was more prevalent, with no instances of the alternative reading known from Roman Britain.

== Characteristics ==
=== Animist hypothesis ===
Rose first compared the numen to the concept of mana in various Oceanic cultures, hypothesizing that the earliest layers of archaic Roman religion included a vast array of minor divine entities with little relevance beyond a single specific function. According to Rose, minor gods such as Cinxia—who was associated with the belt worn by the bride in the Roman wedding ceremony—represented a specific manifestation of the numen. However, the supposition that a numinous presence in the natural world constituted an "animistic" element left over in historical Roman religion and especially in the etymology of Latin theonyms was criticized as "mostly a scholarly fiction" by McGeough (2004). Until the time of Augustus (r. 27 BCE – 14 CE), the term was never used to refer to any particular god. In fact, according to Gradel, given that the gender of the word was neuter, it simply could not have been personified. Moreover, the tern numen often appears in tandem with a genitive form of the words deus ("god") or dea ("goddess"), thus clearly distinguishing the numen from the deity themselves. There are instances where it is feasible to translate numen as denoting some resident divine entity as opposed to an abstract power, such as one inscription from Moesia which references the "numen of the portorium." Fishwick argues that it would be unusual for the portorium, which was a type of tax, to possess "power," but it is also unlikely that the numen Augusti ("numen of Augustus") reference a deity dwelling within the emperor. To remedy this issue, Fishwick suggests that the numen and the genius had been conflated in this instance due overarching similarities between their functions, though he does not extend this notion so far as to conclude to the numen and the genius were in general completely identical entities.

=== Possession of numen ===
The term denoted some abstract concept possessed by a deity. For instance, the 1st-century CE Roman poet Horace recounts a myth wherein Jupiter forms a layer of ice over snow utilizing his "puro numine" ("unimpeded or unmixed numen"). Deities could also possess multiple numina: In the Aeneid, Virgil—a 1st-century BCE Roman poet—ascribes to the goddess Juno numina, in the plural, and Servius—a 4th-century CE Grammarian—writes, in his commentaries upon the Aeneid, that "Iuno multa habet numina" ("Juno has many numina"). It is possible that the usage of specifically the term numina solely served to accommodate the metrical demands of poetry, though it is alternatively possible that the plural form represents the various functions of a deity or the differing ways they could manifest their influence. Livy, a 1st-century BCE Roman historian, ascribes numen to the gods collectively rather than any specific deity, writing, for instance, of the "great will of the gods" ("magnumque deorum numen").

Numen was not reserved exclusively for gods; it was also available to humans—the Roman Senate, and later, the emperor themselves, were sometimes described as holding numen. Furthermore, Cicero, a 2nd-century BCE Roman statesman, ascribes numen to the Roman people collectively, stating in a publication oration that he "will always exhibit vis-à-vis the Roman people the same piety ("pietate") that the most respectable men show to the gods" ("qua sanctissimi homines pietate erga deos immortales esse soleant, eadem me") and that their "power ("numen") will be as venerable and sacred as the one of the immortal gods" ("semper fore numenque vestrum aeque mihi grave et sanctum ac deorum immortalium in omni vita futurum"). Lucretius, a 1st-century BCE Roman author, attributes numen to the human mind, writing "The rest of the spirit, dispersed abroad through the whole body, obeys and is moved according to the numen and working of the intelligence" ("cetera pars animae per totum dissita corpus paret et ad numen mentis momenque movetur").

It was possible to transfer numen from a god to a human, as Ovid implores the god Mars and the emperor Augustus to grant numen to Gaius Caesar during his campaign against Parthia. Numen was also evidently transferable onto an object, as Statius—a 1st-century CE Roman poet—recounts a story wherein Atalanta, a Greek mythological figure, made a tree numinous through her reverence of the site ("numenque colendo fecerat," "by reverencing it she had made its numen"). The classicist Alisa Hunt argues that Roman authors utilize the term to describe concepts that they personally considered significant. Thus, Cicero, the politician and statesman, assigns numen to the Senate and Roman people, whereas Ovid—the poet—ascribes numen to beauty ("formaque numen habet," "and form [i.e. physical appearance, beauty] has numen"). As Hunt notes, in certain circumstances, the numen of an entity is explicitly attributable to some particular physical characteristic of the object in question. For instance, Statius, in his Thebaid, mentions a tree that "stands sacred by the numen of its old age" ("stat sacra senectae numine").

Hunt argues that the vagueness of the numen, and the plethora of distinct entities to which it could be applied, were essential components of its use within Roman culture—it allowed Roman authors to explore the boundaries of what could be considered divine. Hunt argues that, in Roman literature, the language surrounding the numen is often uncertain and unassertive. For instance, Ovid, a 1st-century BCE Roman poet, writes that "sunt etiam qui nos numen habere putent" ("there are those who even think we have the numen"). Moreover, Hunt cites two quotes from Lucan, a 1st-century CE Roman poet, who writes "Ac velut inclusum perfosso in pectore numen" ("a quasi numen in his chest, which had been stabbed clean through") and "o numinis instar, Roma" ("O Rome, the likeness of a numen"). In particular, regarding these two passages, Hunt notes the choice of terms such as "instar" ("likeness") and "velut" ("like, as if"), both of which may reinforce the ambiguous nature of the concept.

=== Divine will or power ===
Cicero utilizes the phrase "divino numine" to translate Ancient Greek "θεῶν ἰότητι" ("theôn iótēti"), a passage from the Odyssey meaning "will of the gods." Like Cicero, Varro also relates the term numen to a Homeric context, though Varro claims that Homer utilized the word in connection with Jupiter, whereas the Greek passage reference by Cicero is used to describe all gods and never specifically Jupiter. Elsewhere in his writings, Cicero equates the term numen with "cōnsilium" ("plan") and "voluntās" ("will"), writing "cum cognitum habeas quod sit summi rectoris ac domini numen, quod consilium, quae voluntas" ("Because you already know what is the will of the supreme ruler and master, what is his intention, what is his wish"). Other Ciceronian writings, however, appear to utilize the term to mean "power:" Cicero writes "Magna vis est cum in deorum immortalium numine tum vero in ipsa re publica" ("Great might is to be found, on the one hand, in the power of the immortal gods, and on the other hand, in the state itself"). In certain passages, both the translation as "power" and as "will" seem appropriate, such as "deorum enim numini parere omnia" ("All things yield to the will/power of the gods"). Cicero also states that human virtue ("virtus ... humana") many "come nearer to the power of the gods" whilst "founding new cities" or "saving those already founded." Fenechlu suggests that this passage implies that, just as virtus was an essential characteristic of a Roman man, numen was vital for the divine.

Varro writes that it was the general wisdom of his day that the term numen signified the imperium ("power") of the divine, and that it derived from "nutus" ("nod, command, will"), in reference to the power of a deity whose nod could command reality. According to the classicist Carmen Fenechlu, the particular choice of the term imperium, which refers more specifically to judicial or political authority, as opposed to the term potestas, which denotes more generic power, implies that Varro had intended to convey that the superiority and "special nature" of the numen. Cicero provides a passage wherein he directly compares the potestas of the Quirites with the numen of the gods, writing "deinde vos, Quirites, quorum potestas proxime ad deorum immortalium numen accedit, oro atque obsecro" ("Then I beg and implore you, citizens, whose might comes very near to the power of the immortal gods."). Within this passage, the term potestas is associated with the mortal humans, whereas the term numen is specifically connected with the divine, perhaps reflecting the aforementioned equation of numen with imperium, and the consequent implication that the numen represented a sort of higher authority. Furthermore, Cicero directly associates the power of the numen with the political institutions of Rome, writing "Magna vis est, magnum numen unum et idem sentientis senatus" ("Great is the force, great is the divine power ("numen") of the senate whose members hold one and the same opinion."). Martial, a 1st-century CE Roman pet, refers to the numen as "sacra potestas" ("sacred power").

Ovid associates the term numen with the adjective sacer ("sacred"), describing a "fons sacer" ("sacred fountain") that "many think holds numen" ("hunc multi numen habere putant"). Moreover, he writes of himself and poets in general that "sacri vates et divum cura vocamur; sunt etiam qui nos numen habere putent" ("Yes, we bards are called sacri, and the care of the gods; there are those who even think we have the numen"). According to the classicist L. R. Lind, this particular passage perhaps employs the original meaning of the term "sacer," which was not sacred, but instead "taboo, cursed." Lind suggests that numina, as supernatural forces of the divine, could inspire fear and awe, and the usage of the sacer denoted these emotions.

=== Ties to the natural world ===
Within his Fasti, Ovid describes a grove and a stream situated beneath the Aventine where, upon viewing, a spectator might declare "numen inest," which has been translated as "There is a spirit here." The classicist Ingrid Edlund-Berry suggests that this reference to a numen dwelling beside a water source may parallel the association between natural springs and other deities, such as Egeria or Juturna, itself an extension of the general sanctity of water in Roman culture. However, according to Hunt, Ovid does not frame this passage as a definitive theological statement; he only claims that—at the sight of the grove—one could utter this phrase, stating "quo posses viso dicere 'numen inest'" ("On seeing which you might say ‘there is a numen within!’"). This passage has been cited as evidence of an animistic conceptualization of the numina, though Ovid also refers to Picus and Faunus as both gods and numina, implying that he did not utilize the term to denote some animist force dwelling with the grove. Instead, according to Hunt, Ovid may have intended to communicate that some particular aspect of the grove invoked an emotional response that itself compelled the onlooker to declare the presence of a numen. Hunt notes that Ovid had preceded his mention of the numen with a description of the physical characteristics of the grove—that it was "niger ilicis umbra" ("black with shady holm oaks").

In another, similarly phrased section of his Amores, Ovid writes that "stat vetus et densa praenubilus arbore lucus; adspice, concedas numen inesse loco" ("A grove stands there, old and extremely gloomy with its dense trees; Look at it, you might concede that there is a numen within the place"). Likewise, Ovid utilizes hypothetical language within this passage; he employs the subjunctive form concedas ("you may concede"), thereby portraying the declaration of a numen as only one possible response. Other Roman authors also mention arboreal numina—those being numina tied specifically to trees. The 1st-century CE Roman naturalist Pliny the Elder, for instance, records that "these [trees] were the temples of the numina" ("haec fuere numinum templa") and also that trees were dedicated to numina—he states "types of trees are kept perpetually dedicated to their own numina" ("arborum genera numinibus suis dicata"). Seneca the Younger writes of a grove ("lucus") that the "loftiness of the forest, the seclusion of the spot, and your marvel at the thick unbroken shade in the midst of the open spaces" ("proceritas silvae et secretum loci et admiratio umbrae in aperto tam densae atque continuae") will all "make you believe in its numen" ("fidem tibi numinis faciet"). Citing this Senecan passage, the classicist Valerie M. Warrior interprets numen as a "sense of the divine" inspired by the natural world and a feeling of "religious awe" ("religio").

Marcus Manilius, a 1st-century CE astrologer, perhaps implies that numina were sacred to the nymphs, as—in certain manuscripts of his work—he is recorded as having said "silvarumque deos sacrataque numina Nymphis" ("The gods of the forests and the numina sacred to the Nymphs"). Nymphs are themselves often associated with natural locations, which parallels the grove Ovid describes with the phrase numen inest. The classicist H. J. Rose argues that this passage from Manilius implies that the numina functioned as a sort of supernatural force that dwelt within various natural loci, such as trees, streams, or caves. However, there are other versions of this text: The Loeb Classical Library edition, as edited by George Patrick Goold, alternatively reads "silvarumque deos secretaque numina Nymphas," which is translated as "the woodland deities and those retiring spirits, the Nymphs." (Note: For further details on the textual criticism of this passage, see Housman, A. E. (1912). M. Manili Astronomicon: Liber Secundus. Grant Richards. pp.4–5.)

== Numina and specific religions ==
The phrase "numen eris caeloque redux mirabere regna" appears on line 129 of the poem Metrum in Genesin, attributed to Hilary of Arles.

== See also ==
- Animism
- Lares
- Numinous
- Penates
- Sacred (comparative religion)
