= Wilhelm Heinrich Roscher =

German classical scholar (1845–1923)

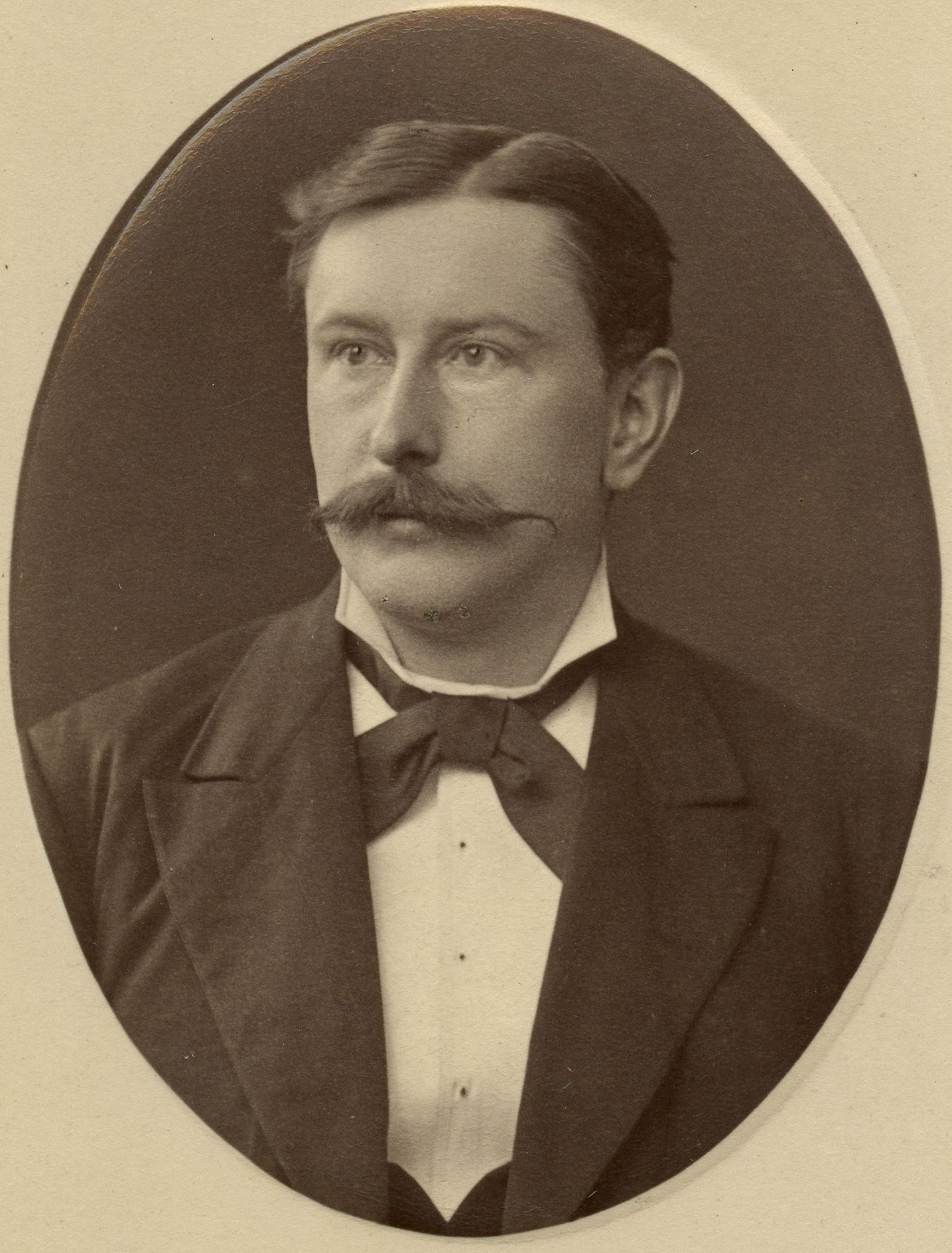
- Born: February 12, 1845; Göttingen, Kingdom of Hanover
- Died: March 9, 1923 (aged 78); Dresden, Weimar Republic

Academic background
- Education: University of Göttingen; Leipzig University

Academic work
- Discipline: Greek and Roman mythology
- Institutions: University of Halle; Humboldt University of Berlin

Wilhelm Heinrich Roscher (12 February 1845, in Göttingen – 9 March 1923, in Dresden) was a German classical scholar. He specialized in studies of Greek and Roman mythology.

He received his education at the Universities of Göttingen and Leipzig, obtaining his PhD in 1868. While at Leipzig, from encouragement by Friedrich Ritschl, he along with fellow students Wilhelm Wisser, Richard Arnold and Friedrich Nietzsche, formed a student philological association in December 1865. Since 1871 he taught classes at the Fürstenschule in Meissen, and from 1882, served as vice-principal at the gymnasium in Wurzen. In 1894, he was appointed school rector. After his retirement in 1905 he lived and worked in Dresden. During his career, he travelled extensively in Europe, his research trips taking him to Italy, France, Dalmatia, Montenegro, Greece and Asia Minor.

The economist Wilhelm Georg Friedrich Roscher (1817–1894) was his father.

== Written works ==
He is best known for his lexicon, the Ausführliches Lexikon der griechischen und römischen Mythologie ("Detailed dictionary of Greek and Roman mythology", 1884–1937; 6 volumes with 4 supplementary volumes, the dictionary being completed by Konrat Ziegler). He also published Neue Omphalosstudien: Ein archäologischer Beitrag zur vergleichenden Religionswissenschaft (1915), an archaeological study of the Omphalos myth. Other significant works by Roscher are:

- Studien Zur Vergleichenden Mythologie Der Griechen und Römer, 1873 – Studies in comparative mythology of the Greeks and Romans.
- Das tiefe Naturgefühl der Griechen und Römer in seiner historischen Entwickelung, 1875 – The deep Naturgefühl of the Greeks and Romans in their historical development.
- Die Gorgonen und Verwandtes: Eine Vorarbeit zu einem Handbuch der griechischen Mythologie vom vergleichenden Standpunkt, 1879 – The Gorgons and related issues: a preliminary work for a handbook of Greek mythology from a comparative point of view.
- Nektar und Ambrosia: Mit einem Anhang über die Grundbedeutung der Aphrodite und Athene, 1883 – Nectar and ambrosia: With an appendix on the basic meanings of Aphrodite and Athena.
- Über Selene und Verwandtes, 1890 – On Selene and related issues.
- Ephialtes: Eine pathologisch-mythologische Abhandlung über die Alptraume und Alpdämonen des Klassischen Altertums, 1900 – Ephialtes: A pathological-mythological treatise on nightmares and the Alpdämonen of classical antiquity.
- Die Hebdomadenlehren der griechischen Philosophen und Aerzte, 1906 – The Hebdomadenlehren of Greek philosophers and physicians.
