= Roman tribe =

Grouping of Roman citizens

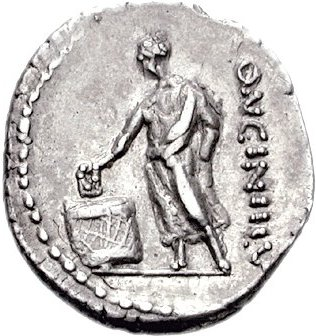
A Roman denarius of 63 BC: a voter casting a ballot

A tribus, or tribe, was a division of the Roman people for military, censorial, and voting purposes. When constituted in the comitia tributa, the tribes were the voting units of a legislative assembly of the Roman Republic.

According to tradition, the first three tribes were established by Romulus; each was divided into ten curiae, or wards, which were the voting units of the comitia curiata. Although the curiae continued throughout Roman history, the three original tribes that they constituted gradually vanished from history. (Note: There is no evidence that the Romulean tribes were ever formally abolished, although they are seldom mentioned in the time of the Republic. However, Livy implies that they still existed, and that members of the college of augurs were traditionally assigned in threes, so that each tribe would be represented by one or more augurs.)

Perhaps influenced by the original division of the people into tribes, as well as the number of thirty wards, Servius Tullius established four tribes dividing Rome and various pagi over the countryside, which later became seventeen rural tribes. After the formation of the republic, these tribes were assembled into a popular assembly called the comitia tributa. As the Roman population and its territory grew, fifteen additional tribes were enrolled, the last in 241 BC.

All Roman citizens were enrolled in one of these tribes, through which they were entitled to vote on the election of certain magistrates, religious officials, judicial decisions in certain suits affecting the plebs, and pass resolutions on various proposals made by the tribunes of the plebs and the higher magistrates. Although the comitia tributa lost most of its legislative functions under the Empire, enrollment in a tribe remained an important part of Roman citizenship until at least the third century AD.

== The Romulean tribes ==
According to the ancient Roman tradition, shortly after the founding of Rome, Romulus created the first three tribes: the Ramnes, Tities, and Luceres. The etymology of the Latin word tribus is unclear: it may relate to the word for three (tres) or a cognate in the Iguvine Tablets referring to the community as a whole. Others say the word instead is derived from tribuere, referring to divisions and distributions.

=== Formation ===
Livy relates that after the Rape of the Sabine Women, the Sabines under Titus Tatius attacked Rome, and successfully entered the city. After fierce fighting, the Sabine women themselves interceded, stepping between their husbands and their fathers to prevent further bloodshed. Peace was concluded, with Romulus and Tatius ruling jointly, and a large Sabine population relocating to Rome. The nascent city was thus evenly divided between Latins and Sabines. After this, traditionally dated to 750 BC, Romulus created the tribes.

Known as the three Romulean tribes, these first tribes have often been supposed to represent the major ethnic groups of early Rome with the Ramnes representing Rome's Latin population, the Tities representing the Sabines, and the Luceres probably representing the Etruscans. Rome lay on the Tiber, the traditional boundary of Etruria with Latium, and may have had a substantial Etruscan population from the beginning; but certainly there was a considerable Etruscan element in the Roman population by the sixth century BC; the fifth and seventh kings of Rome were Etruscan, and many of Rome's cultural institutions were of Etruscan origin. It may be to this period, rather than the time of Romulus, that the institution of the Luceres belongs; and indeed the names, if not the ethnic character, of all three of the Romulean tribes appear to be Etruscan.

Although the theory that the Romulean tribes represented the city's original ethnic components continues to be represented in modern scholarship, it has never been universally accepted, and this view is rejected by many scholars. This is because "the idea that the three tribes were distinct ethnic groups has no support in the ancient sources". Kathryn Lomas, in the 2018 book Rise of Rome, attributes the popularity of the explanation to nationalist politics of the 19th and 20th centuries.

=== The curiae ===
These three tribes were in turn divided into thirty curiae, or wards, the organization of which is unclear. The etymology of the word may derive from co-viria – a gathering of men – with each group electing a leader, known as a curio. Among the curiones, one was selected as head of all the curiae, with the title curio maximus. The members of the curiae were known as curiales. Each curia was attended by a priest, or curio, who assisted by another priest, known as the flamen curialis, undertook the religious obligations of the ward. Each also had its own place of meeting, also known as a curia.

The curiae were said to have been named after thirty of the Sabine Women, but of the nine curiae whose names are known today, several are of geographical origin. The only curiae whose names are now known were: Acculeia, (Note: According to Varro, the curia Acculeia made a sacrifice to Angerona during the festival of the Angeronalia, on December 21. This may have been a special honour, as Angerona was the tutelary goddess of Rome itself. There was a gens Accoleia, probably derived from the same source, and either the curia was named after the gens, or if this ward was named for one of the Sabine women, perhaps Accoleia was a matronymic surname, based on an ancient praenomen such as Acca. Various traditions relating to an Acca Larentia are associated with Romulus.) Calabra, Faucia, (Note: Livy mentions that the curia Faucia was particularly ill-omened, because it had cast the first vote in 390 BC, the year that Rome was sacked by the Gauls, and again in 321 BC, the year of the disaster at the Caudine Forks; they cast the first vote again in 310, but the ill omen came to naught, as the Romans won an important victory over the Etruscans. According to Licinius Macer, the curia Faucia had also cast the first vote in 477 BC, the year of the destruction of the Fabii at the Cremera.) Foriensis, (Note: Foriensis probably refers to the area around the Roman Forum.) Rapta, (Note: Raptus is an adjective meaning "abducted" or "captured". In its feminine form, it could well be a reference to one of the Sabine women.) Tifata, (Note: Festus says that tifata means "full of holm oaks". However, it also referred to various places, including a Curia Tifata at Rome, which in another passage Festus explains was named after a certain Curius who lived there. Thus, while Festus seems to say in one passage that Tifata was one of the thirty curiae, there is some doubt as to whether it was instead a place name; or perhaps it was both.) Titia, (Note: Festus informs us that the curia Titia, like the tribe of the Tities, was named after Titus Tatius; but Poucet disagrees. Titia was also a women's praenomen.) Veliensis, (Note: Veliensis refers to the Velian Hill, a ridge in central Rome joining the Palatine Hill and the Oppian Hill. The origin of the name is obscure; but Velia is an Etruscan woman's praenomen, and there was a gens Velia.) and Velitia.

In the past, it was widely believed that membership in the curiae was limited to the patricians, and that statements to the contrary, indicating that clientes were admitted meant no more than that they were passive members with no voting rights. However, Mommsen argued convincingly that the plebeians were included in voting, and this view now appears to have prevailed; the plebeians were included either from the beginning, or at least from an early date; certainly from the earliest years of the Republic.

=== The comitia curiata ===
When the various curiae were assembled for voting, they formed the comitia curiata. It was founded under the kings and survived through to the end of the republic. One of the curiones was appointed or elected curio maximus, and presided over the assembly. Under the kings, the comitia curiata was summoned by the king or by an interrex, who would present questions upon which the comitia might vote. These included the election of a new king, as proposed by the interrex; the passing of a law conferring imperium on the king, known as a lex curiata de imperio; whether to declare war; rulings on appeals; matters relating to arrogatio; (Note: Arrogatio, or arrogation, was a particular type of adoption specific to Roman culture. It was a means of ensuring that a particular family line did not become extinct, merely because a man had no children of his own. In order to qualify, the adoptor had to be both childless and incapable of having children, while the adoptee had to be an adult. This process was of particular interest to the patricians, who formed an increasingly small minority of the Roman populus as time passed; normally, the adoptee would receive the status of his adopted father, and thus a patrician adopted into a plebeian gens would normally lose his patrician status; this principle was used by Publius Clodius Pulcher to pass over to the plebeians, and become eligible to hold office as tribune of the plebs, although in his case the adoption was technically illegal, as his adoptive father was a young man, presumably capable of having children. On the other hand, a plebeian might obtain patrician status by being adopted into a patrician gens, and this would also have been of concern to the patricians. There may have been exceptions to the usual rule; a family of the Junii Silani descended from the patrician Manlia gens seems to have retained their patrician status, although adopted into the plebeian Junii; Gaius Junius Silanus was Flamen Martialis, a priestly office restricted to the patricians.) and whether to allow foreigners to be received among the patricians. Under Servius Tullius, the rights to declare war and to decide appeals were transferred to the comitia centuriata, another legislative assembly.

After the downfall of the Roman monarchy, questions were presented to the comitia curiata by the Roman Senate. However, between 494 and 449 BC, most of its functions were relegated to the comitia tributa and the comitia centuriata. The higher magistrates were elected by the comitia centuriata, which also presided over certain capital trials, and held the power to declare war, and to pass legislation presented by the senate. Lesser magistrates were elected by the comitia tributa, which also elected religious officials, presided over trials affecting the plebeians, and passed resolutions based on legislation proposed by the tribunes of the plebs and various magistrates. The comitia curiata retained the power to confer imperium on magistrates elected by the comitia centuriata, and to confirm alterations in the Roman constitution decided upon by the other two comitia; both of these, however, required the senate to propose them before the comitia could act. The comitia also retained the power to decide whether to admit a non-patrician into that order, and to oversee the process of arrogatio, particularly when a patrician was being adopted into a plebeian family.

By the late republic, each curia was represented by only one lictor, usually under the presidency of the pontifex maximus.

== The Servian tribes ==
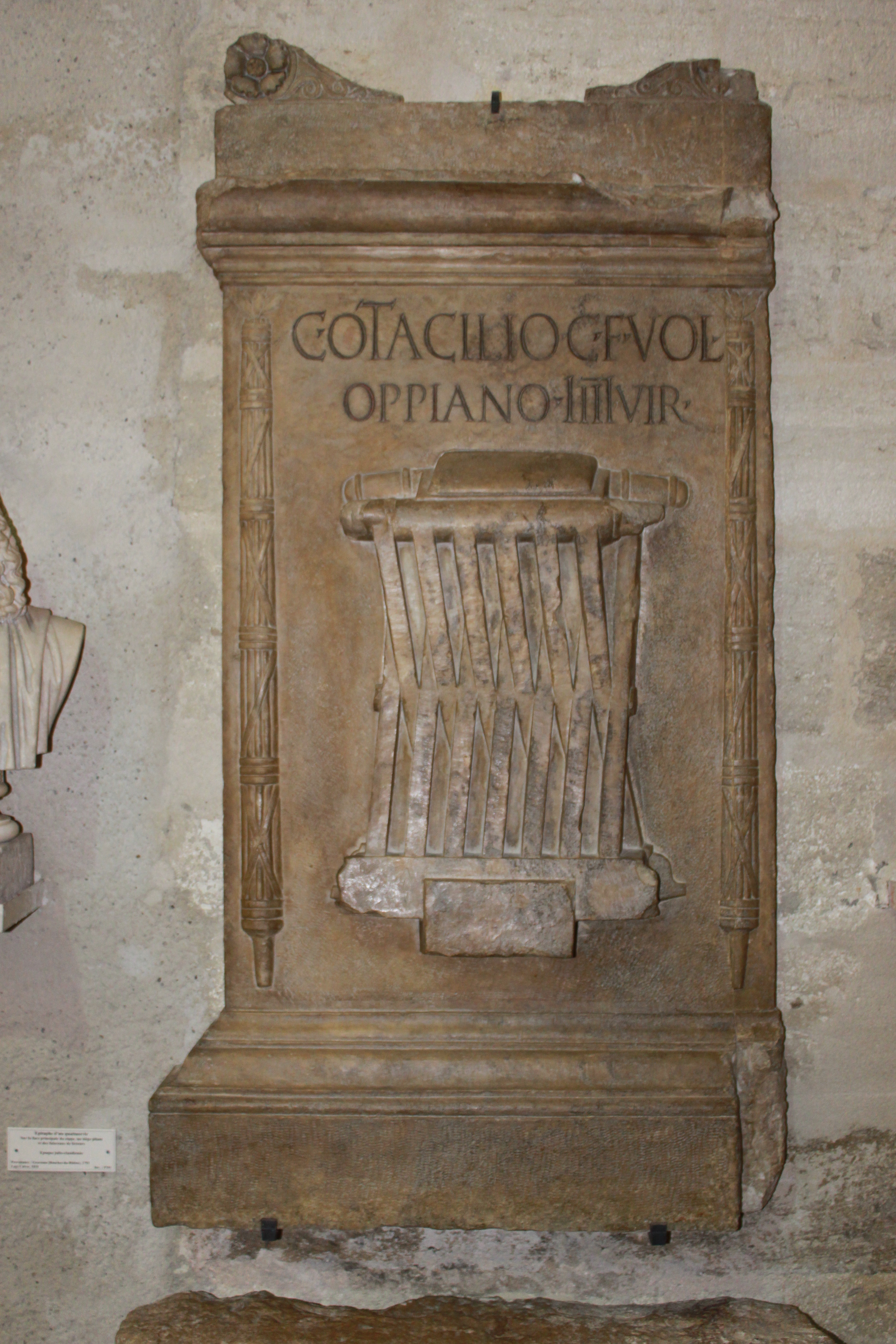
Inscription (CIL 13.1029) from Gallia Narbonensis, recording the enrollment of Gaius Otacilius in the tribus Voltinia (abbreviated VOL), into which Gallic citizens were frequently placed.

According to the Roman tradition, Servius Tullius, the sixth king (traditionally r. 579 – 534 BC), abolished the Romulean tribes (though not the curiae) and re-divided the city into four urban tribes and twenty-six pagi which coalesced into seventeen rural tribes. The names of the four urban tribes were based on the four regions of the city that they represented, while those of the rural tribes were likely based on the names of families that owned considerable tracts of land in those areas.

Each tribe was both a territorial and administrative unit, with officials called tribules who counted and facilitated the votes of tribe members. Another group of officials, the divisores coordinated gifts among tribesmen and were regularly implicated in electoral bribery during the late republic.

Further officers included a curator tribuum, who served as the head of the tribe, and tribuni aerarii, or tribunes of the treasury, whose responsibility was for the tribe's financial obligations; they were responsible for collecting the war tax, and distributed pay to the tribe's soldiers.

Membership in a tribe was prima facie proof of Roman citizenship and also formed the basis on which the army was levied. Toward the end of the Republic, the tribe became so important that it became an official part of a Roman's name, usually appearing, in the most formal documents and inscriptions, between a citizen's filiation and any cognomina.

=== Later tribes ===
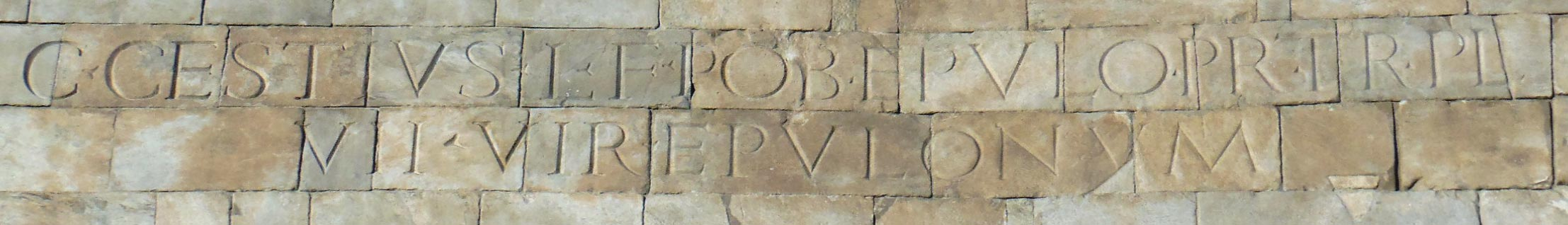
Inscription on the Pyramid of Cestius, noting that Gaius Cestius was a member of the tribe of Poblilia (POB).

The dates of the creation of the remaining tribes are all known. When the Sabine Appius Claudius removed to Rome together with his clientes, in 504 BC, he was admitted to the patriciate, and assigned lands in the region around the mouth of the Anio. These settlers became the basis of the tribus Claudia, which was admitted in 495 BC, during Claudius' consulship, along with the tribus Crustumina or Clustumina.

Four more tribes were added in 387 BC: Arniensis, Sabatina, Stellatina, and Tromentina. With the addition of Volscian territory in 358 BC, two more tribes were formed, Pomptina and Publilia (also found as Poblilia). In 332, the censors Quintus Publilius Philo and Spurius Postumius Albinus enrolled two more tribes, Maecia (originally Maicia) and Scaptia. Oufentina and Falerina followed in 318, and in 299 Aniensis and Terentina were added. The last two tribes, Quirina and Velina, were established in 241 BC, bringing the number of tribes to its final total of thirty-five.

The names of the various tribes vary, both due to scribal error and changes in Latin orthography. For example, the tribe Maecia must originally have been Maicia due to its abbreviation as Mai; Crustumina and Clustumina are used interchangeably. With their usual abbreviations, the tribes were: (Note: Further tribal name irregularities include Poplilia and Poblilia for Publilia. Internal letters are also sometimes omitted: Falerna in place of Falerina, Sabatia for Sabatina, Teretina for Terentina, and Votinia for Voltinia.)

The four urban tribes

- Collina (Col.)
- Esquilina (Esq.)
- Palatina (Pal.)
- Suburana (Sub./Suc.)

The rural tribes

- Aemilia (Aem.)
- Aniensis (Ani.)
- Arniensis (Arn.)
- Camilia (Cam.)
- Claudia (Cla.)
- Crustumina (Clu.)
- Cornelia (Cor.)
- Fabia (Fab.)

- Falerina (Fal.)
- Galeria (Gal.)
- Horatia (Hor.)
- Lemonia (Lem.)
- Maecia (Mae./Mai.)
- Menenia (Men.)
- Papiria (Pap.)
- Pollia (Pol.)

- Pomptina (Pom.)
- Publilia (Pub./Pob.)
- Pupinia (Pup.)
- Quirina (Qui.)
- Romilia (Rom.)
- Sabatina (Sab.)
- Scaptia (Scap.)
- Sergia (Ser.)

- Stellatina (Ste.)
- Terentina (Ter.)
- Tromentina (Tro.)
- Oufentina (Ouf.)
- Velina (Vel.)
- Veturia (Vet.)
- Voltinia (Vol.)

Although the names of the older rural tribes are those of patrician families, the tribes themselves were probably entirely plebeian until 449 BC, after which both patricians and plebeians were enrolled; before this time, many of the powers and responsibilities later held by the comitia tributa still belonged to the comitia curiata. While we know the origin of their names, the location of the territories which defined these tribes is uncertain.

The enrollment of new citizens in particular tribes became a significant political issue during the censorship of Appius Claudius Caecus in 312 BC. Those who wished to limit the voting power of the lower social orders, and particularly of freedmen, advocated enrolling them only in the four urban tribes. This effort was largely unsuccessful, except with respect to freedmen, who were nearly always enrolled in one of the urban tribes. A similar attempt to limit the power of newly enfranchised citizens followed the end of the Social War. It was also possible for one of the censors to punish an individual by expelling him from one of the rustic tribes, and assigning him to one of the urban tribes; this was known as tribu movere.

After 241 BC, no further tribes were created. Legislation, passed concurrently by the senate and the people, decreed that citizens created by further territorial annexation would be registered in one of the rural tribes. Before this reform, the tribes had been relatively contiguous units; after it, they became geographically fragmented across Roman territory. After the Social War, which saw the enfranchisement of Rome's Italian allies and a massive increase in the citizen population, there was a vigorous debate at Rome as to whether further tribes should be created, but it was eventually decided to register the new citizens in the existing thirty-five.

In imperial times, the enrollment of citizens in tribes along a geographic basis was resumed; for instance, easterners were typically enrolled in the tribes Collina and Quirina, while in Gallia Narbonensis enrollment in the tribus Voltinia was preferred.

=== The comitia tributa ===
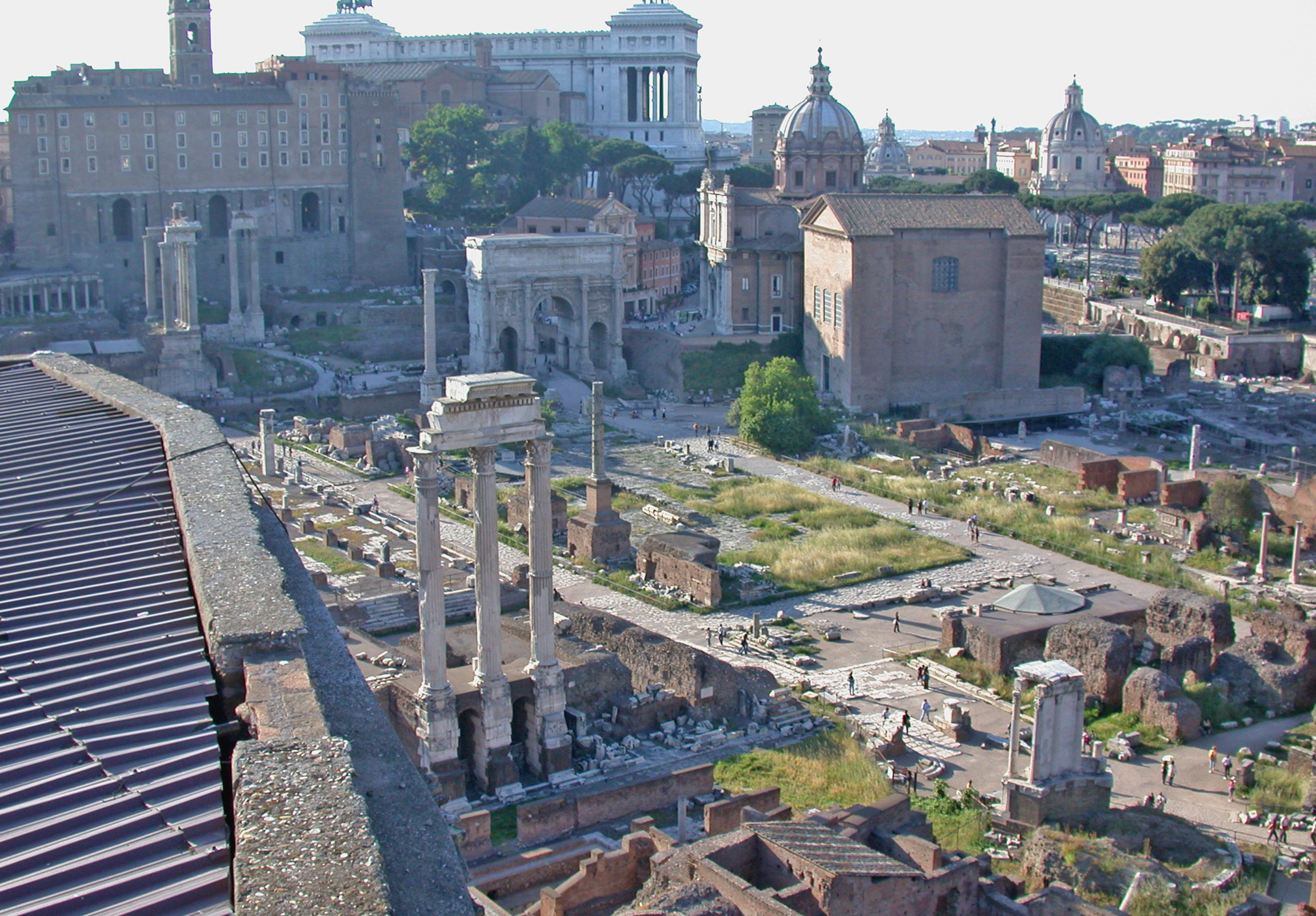
A view of the Roman Forum from the Palatine Hill.

Together, the Servian tribes constituted the concilium plebis, or plebeian council; as time passed and the council's authority to pass legislation developed, it was increasingly known as the comitia plebis tributa, or tribal assembly. A law passed in 449 BC made resolutions of the comitia tributa, known as plebi scita, or plebiscites, binding upon the whole Roman people; this law was not ratified by the senate until 286 BC, but even before this its resolutions were considered binding on the plebs. Because all citizens, whether patrician or plebeian, received the same vote in the comitia tributa, and because the assembly was much simpler to convene than the comitia centuriata, the comitia tributa was Rome's most democratic assembly. By the end of the Republic, the plebs greatly outnumbered the patricians, and it was through this comitia that the collective will of the citizens could be exercised without regard to wealth or status.

==== Powers ====
The comitia tributa elected all of the lower magistrates, including the tribunes of the plebs, the military tribunes, the plebeian aediles and the curule aediles. A committee of seventeen tribes, chosen by lot, nominated the Pontifex Maximus, and co-opted members of the collegia of the pontifices, augures, and the decemviri sacrorum.

The comitia could pass resolutions proposed by the tribunes of the plebs, or by the higher magistrates, on both domestic and foreign matters, such as the making of treaties or concluding of peace. Proposals had to be published before receiving a vote, and were passed or rejected as a whole, without modification. Although the senate might review these resolutions, it could only reject them if they had been passed without the proper formalities.

The comitia tributa also decided suits instituted by the plebeian tribunes and aediles, for offenses against the plebs or their representatives. In the later Republic, these suits typically involved charges of maladministration; the tribunes and aediles were entitled to levy substantial fines.

==== Procedures ====
Beginning with the institution of the tribunes of the plebs in 494 BC, the comitia tributa was normally summoned by the tribunes themselves. Magistrates could also convene the comitia, but only with the consent of the tribunes. The comitia was summoned by the proclamation of a praeco, a crier or herald, at least seventeen days before the meeting. The auspices would be taken, and the meeting could only proceed if they were favourable. The tribes convened at daybreak, and were obliged to adjourn at sunset. If summoned by one of the tribunes, the tribes had to gather within the city, or within a one-mile radius of the city; this was the boundary of a tribune's authority. In the first centuries of the Republic, the comitia usually met on the Capitol, in the Forum, or at the Comitium. If summoned by one of the magistrates, the comitia typically met on the Campus Martius.

After a prayer, unaccompanied by sacrifice, proposals would be read, and the citizens arranged by tribe. The first tribe to vote, known as the principium, was chosen by lot, and the result of its vote announced. The other tribes would then vote simultaneously, and the results of their votes announced in an order also determined by lot, before the final result was proclaimed. Laws passed by the comitia took effect as soon as the results were announced. Although the order of voting was determined by lot, there was also an official order of the tribes, known as the ordo tribuum. The first four tribes were the urban tribes, in the order: Suburana, Palatina, Esquilina, Collina; the rural tribes followed, concluding with Aniensis. (Note: Crawford postulates that the rustic tribes were enumerated along the major roads leading from Rome (the Viae Ostiensis, Appia, Latina, Praenestina, Valeria, Salaria, Flaminia and Clodia), in a counter-clockwise order: Romilia, Voltinia, Voturia, Aemilia, Horatia, Maecia, Scaptia, Pomptina, Falerina, Lemonia, Papiria, Oufentina, Terentina, Pupinia, Menenia, Publilia, Cornelia, Claudia, Camilia, Aniensis, Fabia, Pollia, Sergia, Clustumina, Quirina, Velina, Stellatina, Tromentina, Galeria, Sabatina, Arniensis.)

==== Decline ====
In the final years of the Republic, participation in the comitia was quite low, and its acts increasingly the result of corruption. Caesar deprived the comitia tributa of the power to declare war or conclude peace; the early emperors further curtailed its power. Augustus removed the comitia's judicial function, and preserved its power to pass legislation only in form. He filled half of the available magistracies with his own candidates, and Tiberius transferred the comitia's remaining electoral authority to the senate. Although the emperors received many of their powers from the comitia tributa, this was only a formality.

Although the comitia tributa continued to exist until the third century AD, its only remaining functions were symbolic; it took auspices and gave prayer; it conferred the emperor's legislative powers and other authority; and it proclaimed the laws presented to it for approval. But by this time voting was done not by ballot, but by acclamatio.

== See also ==
- List of Roman tribes

== Bibliography ==
Primary sources

- Marcus Terentius Varro, De Lingua Latina (On the Latin Language).
- Titus Livius (Livy), History of Rome.
- Sextus Pompeius Festus, Epitome de M. Verrio Flacco de Verborum Significatu (Epitome of Marcus Verrius Flaccus: On the Meaning of Words).

Secondary sources

- Cornell, Tim (1995). The beginnings of Rome. London: Routledge. ISBN 0-415-01596-0. OCLC 31515793.
- Crawford, Michael Hewson (2002). "Tribus, tessères et régions". Comptes rendus des séances de l'Académie des Inscriptions et Belles-Lettres. 146 (4): 1125–1136. doi:10.3406/crai.2002.22505.
- Hammond, NGL; Scullard, HH, eds. (1970). Oxford Classical Dictionary (2nd ed.). Oxford: Clarendon Press.
  - Momigliano, Arnaldo (1970a). "comitia". In OCD^{2} (1970).
  - Momigliano, Arnaldo (1970b). "tribus". In OCD^{2} (1970).
  - Treves, Piero. "tribuni aerarii". In OCD^{2} (1970).
- Hornblower, Simon; et al., eds. (2012). The Oxford classical dictionary (4th ed.). Oxford University Press. ISBN 978-0-19-954556-8. OCLC 959667246.
  - Momigliano, Arnaldo; Cornell, Tim (2012a). "comitia". In OCD^{4} (2012). doi:10.1093/acrefore/9780199381135.013.1747
  - Momigliano, Arnaldo; Cornell, Tim (2012b). "curia (1)". In OCD^{4} (2012). doi:10.1093/acrefore/9780199381135.013.1958
  - Momigliano, Arnaldo; Cornell, Tim (2012c). "tribus". In OCD^{4} (2012). doi:10.1093/acrefore/9780199381135.013.6555
- Lomas, Kathryn (2018). The rise of Rome: from the Iron age to the Punic wars. Harvard University Press. ISBN 978-0-674-65965-0.
- Mommsen, Theodor (1864). Römische Forschungen (in German). Vol. 1. Weidmann.
- Mommsen, Theodor (1879). Römische Forschungen (in German). Vol. 2. Weidmann.
- Peck, Harry Thurston, ed. (1896). Harper's dictionary of classical literature and antiquities (2nd ed.). New York: Harper & Brothers.
- Rieger, Michael (2007). Tribus und Stadt. Die Entstehung der römischen Wahlbezirke im urbanen und mediterranen Kontext (ca. 750–450 v. Chr.). Vandenhoeck & Ruprecht. ISBN 978-3-89744-237-5.
- Simpson, D P (1963). Cassell's New Compact Latin-English, English-Latin Dictionary. Dell. ISBN 978-0-440-31101-0.
- Smith, Christopher J (2006). The Roman Clan: The Gens from Ancient Ideology to Modern Anthropology. Cambridge University Press. ISBN 978-0-521-85692-8.
- Traupman, John C (1995). The New College Latin & English Dictionary. Bantam Books. ISBN 978-0-553-57301-5.
- Vishnia, Rachel Feig (2012). Roman elections in the age of Cicero. Routledge. doi:10.4324/9780203133293. ISBN 978-1-136-47872-7.
