= Velia (disambiguation) =

Velia may refer to:

== Places ==
- Velia, the ancient Greek town named Elea in Italy, now part of the municipality of Ascea, Province of Salerno
- Velian Hill (or Velia), an ancient hill of Rome, Italy
- Novi Velia, a municipality of the Province of Salerno in Italy
- Ascea-Velia, the semi-official name from 2003 of the Italian municipality of Ascea

== Other meanings ==
- Velia (bug), a genus of the riffle bug family Veliidae
- Velia gens, an ancient Roman family
- Velia (given name), a female Italian name
- Ana Velia Guzmán, Mexican journalist

== See also ==
- Elea (disambiguation)
