= December (Roman month) =

12th month of the year

December (from Latin decem, "ten") or mensis December was originally the tenth month of the Roman calendar, following November (novem, "nine") and preceding Ianuarius. It had 29 days. When the calendar was reformed to create a 12-month year starting in Ianuarius, December became the twelfth month, but retained its name, as did the other numbered months from Quintilis (July) to December. Its length was increased to 31 days under the Julian calendar reform.

== Dates ==
The Romans did not number days of a month sequentially from the first day through the last. Instead, they counted back from the three fixed points of the month: the Nones (5th or 7th), the Ides (13th or 15th), and the Kalends (1st) of the following month. The Nones of December was the 5th, and the Ides the 13th. The last day of December was the pridie Kalendas Ianuarias, "day before the Januarian Kalends". Roman counting was inclusive; December 9 was ante diem V Idūs Decembrīs, "the 5th day before the Ides of December," usually abbreviated a.d. V Id. Dec. (or with the a.d. omitted altogether); December 24 was IX Kal. Ian., "the 9th day before the Kalends of Ianuarius," on the Julian calendar (VII Kal. Ian. on the pre-Julian calendar, when December had only 29 days).

On the calendar of the Roman Republic and early Principate, each day was marked with a letter to denote its religiously lawful status. Each day was marked with a letter such as:

- F for dies fasti, days when it was legal to initiate action in the courts of civil law.
- C, for dies comitalis, a day on which the Roman people could hold assemblies (comitia), elections, and certain kinds of judicial proceedings.
- N for dies nefasti, when these political activities and the administration of justice were prohibited.
- NP, the meaning of which remains elusive, but which marked feriae, public holidays.
- EN for endotercissus, an archaic form of intercissus, "cut in half," meaning days that were nefasti in the morning, when sacrifices were being prepared, and in the evening, while sacrifices were being offered, but were fasti in the middle of the day.

By the late 2nd century AD, extant calendars no longer showed days marked with these letters, probably in part as a result of calendar reforms undertaken by Marcus Aurelius. Days were also marked with nundinal letters in cycles of A B C D E F G H, to mark the "market week".

Modern date	Roman date	status	Observances
December 1	Kalendae Decembrīs	N	
2	ante diem IV Nonas Decembrīs	N	
3	III Non. Dec.	N	• Bona Dea rites for women only
4	pridie Nonas Decembrīs (abbrev. prid. Non. Dec.)	C	
5	Nonae Decembrīs	F	• A country festival for Faunus held by the pagi
6	VIII Id. Dec.	F	
7	VII Id. Dec.	C	
8	VI Id. Dec.	C	• Festival for Tiberinus Pater and Gaia
9	V Id. Dec.	C	
10	IV Id. Dec.	C	
11	III Id. Dec.	NP	• AGONALIA for Indiges; also the (probably unrelated) Septimontium
12	pridie Idūs Decembrīs (abbrev. prid. Id. Dec.)	EN	• Ceremonies at the Temple of Consus on the Aventine
13	Idūs Decembrīs	NP	• dies natalis of the Temple of Tellus, and associated lectisternium for Ceres
14	XIX Kal. Ian.	F	
15	XVIII Kal. Ian.	NP	• CONSVALIA or Feriae for Consus, the second of the year
16	XVII Kal. Ian.	C	
17	XVI Kal. Ian.	NP	• SATVRNALIA
18	XV Kal. Ian.	C	• EPONALIA in honor of Epona • Saturnalia continues
19	XIV Kal. Ian.	NP	• OPALIA in honor of Ops • Saturnalia continues
20	XIII Kal. Ian.	C	
21	XII Kal. Ian.	NP	• DIVALIA in honor of Angerona; Hercules and Ceres also received a sacrifice
22	XI Kal. Ian.	C	• Anniversary of the Temple of the Lares Permarini in the Porticus Minucia
23	X Kal. Ian.	NP	• LARENTALIA; commemorations for the temples of Diana and Juno Regina in the Circus Flaminius, and for the Tempestates; Sigillaria, the last day of the Saturnalia, devoted to gift-giving
24	IX Kal. Ian.	C	
25	VIII Kal. Ian.	C	• Dies Natalis Solis Invicti ("Birthday of the Unconquered Sun"); Brumalia (both Imperial)
26	VII Kal. Ian.	C	
27	VI Kal. Ian.	C	
28	V Kal. Ian.	C	
29	IV Kal. Ian.	C	
30	III Kal. Ian.	C	
31	prid. Kal. Ian.	C	

== See also ==
- December, for the modern calendar month.
