= Accoleia gens =

Ancient Roman family

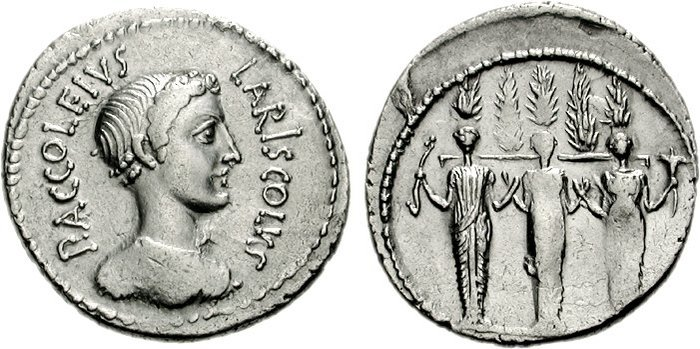
Denarius issued by Publius Accoleius Lariscolus, 43 BC. The reverse is often identified as a depiction of Diana Nemorensis, but it may represent Acca Larentia, perhaps the legendary ancestor of the gens, and the source of its nomen.

The gens Accoleia, also spelled Acoleia, Acculeia, and Aculeia, was a minor plebeian family at Rome during the latter part of the Republic. Most of what is known of this gens comes from various coins and inscriptions.

== Origin and meaning ==
The origin of the nomen is uncertain, but the gens apparently shared its name with one of the thirty curiae, or wards, which formed divisions of the three Romulean tribes, suggesting that the family might have been of great antiquity, although if so it was exceedingly obscure. One tradition states that the curiae were named after the Sabine women carried off in the time of Romulus. Of the few whose names are known, several correspond with particular neighborhoods of Rome, although this does not establish whether the wards were originally named after historical or mythological personages.

One such person, Acca Larentia, was the foster-mother of Romulus and Remus, suggesting that perhaps Acculeia was a nomen derived from Acca. This might account for the fact that the curia Acculeia carried out a sacrifice in honor of Angerona, the tutelary goddess of Rome itself, during the Angeronalia. A denarius issued by Publius Accoleius Lariscolus, pictured above, may represent the worship of Acca Larentia, although the figure has also been identified as that of Diana Nemorensis, depicted as a triple goddess.

Perhaps less romantically, the nomen could be derived from the noun aculeus, meaning a "thorn" or "needle", or the corresponding adjective, with the additional meaning of "sharp".

== Praenomina ==
The main praenomina of the Accoleii were Lucius and Publius. The family used a few other names, including Marcus and Quintus. All were among the most common names throughout Roman history.

== Branches and cognomina ==
All of the cognomina borne by members of this gens appear to have been personal surnames, such as Lariscolus, Euhermerus, and Abascantus.

== Members ==
This list includes abbreviated praenomina. For an explanation of this practice, see filiation.

- Lucius Accoleius M. f., named in an inscription from Rome.
- Lucius Acculeius, named in an inscription from Nemus Dianae in Latium.
- Marcus Accoleius M. f., an aedile, mentioned in an inscription from Nemus Dianae.
- Marcus Acculeius M. f., named in an inscription from Philippi as a friend of Gaius Julius Rhoemetalces, King of Odrysian Thrace from AD 38 to 46.
- Quintus Accoleius Q. l. A[...], a freedman buried at Aricia in Latium.
- Lucius Acculeius Abascantus, a soldier stationed at Rome, serving in the century of Gnaeus Pompeius Pelas, in AD 70.
- Publius Acculeius Apolaustus, probably a freedman, buried at Acelum in Venetia and Histria, with a monument dedicated by his wife, Acculeia Zosime.
- Aculeia Bacchis, the wife of Publius Pomponius Diophanes, according to a funerary inscription from Emerita Augusta in Lusitania.
- Publius Acculeius Euhemerus, named in an inscription from Ostia, dating to AD 172.
- Publius Accoleius Lariscolus, triumvir monetalis in 43 BC, perhaps the same person named in a dedicatory inscription to Bellona at Lanuvium.
- Acculeius Mystes, dedicated a tomb at Rome for his son, Publius Acculeius Ulpianus.
- Lucius Acculeius L. l. Salvius, a freedman buried at Rome.
- Publius Acculeius Ulpianus, the son of Acculeius Mystes, who built a tomb for Ulpianus at Rome.
- Acculeia Zosime, probably a freedwoman, dedicated a tomb at Acelum to her husband, Publius Acculeius Apolaustus.

== See also ==
- List of Roman gentes

== Bibliography ==
- Marcus Terentius Varro, De Lingua Latina (On the Latin Language).
- Dictionary of Greek and Roman Biography and Mythology, William Smith, ed., Little, Brown and Company, Boston (1849).
- Theodor Mommsen et alii, Corpus Inscriptionum Latinarum (The Body of Latin Inscriptions, abbreviated CIL), Berlin-Brandenburgische Akademie der Wissenschaften (1853–present).
- Dictionary of Greek and Roman Antiquities, William Smith, ed., Little, Brown, and Company, Boston (1859).
- Wilhelm Henzen, Ephemeris Epigraphica: Corporis Inscriptionum Latinarum Supplementum (Journal of Inscriptions: Supplement to the Corpus Inscriptionum Latinarum, abbreviated EE), Institute of Roman Archaeology, Rome (1872–1913).
- René Cagnat et alii, L'Année épigraphique (The Year in Epigraphy, abbreviated AE), Presses Universitaires de France (1888–present).
- D.P. Simpson, Cassell's Latin and English Dictionary, Macmillan Publishing Company, New York (1963).
- John C. Traupman, The New College Latin & English Dictionary, Bantam Books, New York (1995).
- Giulia D'Angelo and Alberto Martín Esquivel, "P. Accoleius Lariscolus (RRC 486/1)", in Annali dell'Istituto Italiano di Numismatica, vol. 58 (2012), pp. 139–160.
- Alberto Martín Esquivel and Giulia D'Angelo, "Un cuño romano republicano de P. Accoleius Lariscolus", in Nvmisma. Revista de estudios numismáticos, 258. Año LXIV (2014), pp. 51-59.
