= Johann Wilhelm Beyer =

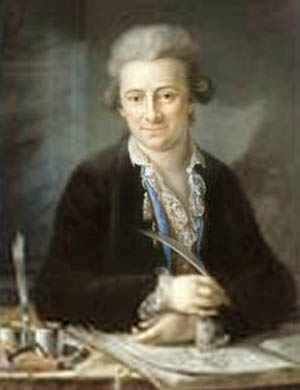
Johann Christian Wilhelm Beyer portrayed by his wife Gabrielle née Bertrand, 1775

Johann Wilhelm Beyer (27 December 1725 in Gotha, † 23 March 1796 in Hietzing), a German sculptor, porcelain artist, painter and garden designer. Beyer has the largest share in the design of the gardens and statues of Schönbrunn Palace, which is regarded as his masterpiece.

== Youth and studies ==
Beyer was trained as a garden-engineer early on by his father Johann Nicholas Beyer, who was a gardener in the service of Charles Eugene, Duke of Württemberg.

Between 1748 and 1751, Beyer traveled to Paris where he studied architecture and painting. Later he went to Rome where he tried the study of painting, but turned to sculpture after he participated in excavations of ancient statues.

== Model champion in Ludwigsburg ==
After returning to Stuttgart in 1759 Beyer worked as ducal Württemberg court painter to 1767 and as a model master of porcelain in Ludwigsburg.

== Goes to Vienna ==
After Beyer had left the Duke's service in February 1767, he moved to Vienna. Already in 1768 he was a member of the Imperial Academy. He was hired in 1769 at the court and promoted in 1770 to imperial court painter, statuarius (sculptor) and chamber architect. Beyer's reputation as an artist, however was offset by his egotism. He reportedly undercut his competition, leaving him very unpopular with fellow artists and staff.

He married in 1771 the painter Gabrielle Bertrand, daughter of the captain of Schönbrunn Palace, and an art teacher of the Archduchess Marie Caroline and Marie Antoinette, and one of the few female members of the Academy. In 1778 he purchased a house in Hietzing.

In 1779 Beyer's two-volume engraving plant in Austria created a stir because the imagery and architecture were foreign to most. He documented the detailed explanations with references to the mythological sources of mythology (Virgil, Ovid, Plutarch and contemporary encyclopedias). After completing work for Schönbrunn and after the death of his patroness Maria Theresa in 1780, he went back to garden design. In work dating from 1784 he influences German garden and landscape design, pushing for a middle ground between the English and French garden design.

Beyers divorced Gabrielle Bertrand 1785. In the same year he wrote the first known written a draft regulation of the river Wien.

== Configuration of the Schönbrunn gardens ==
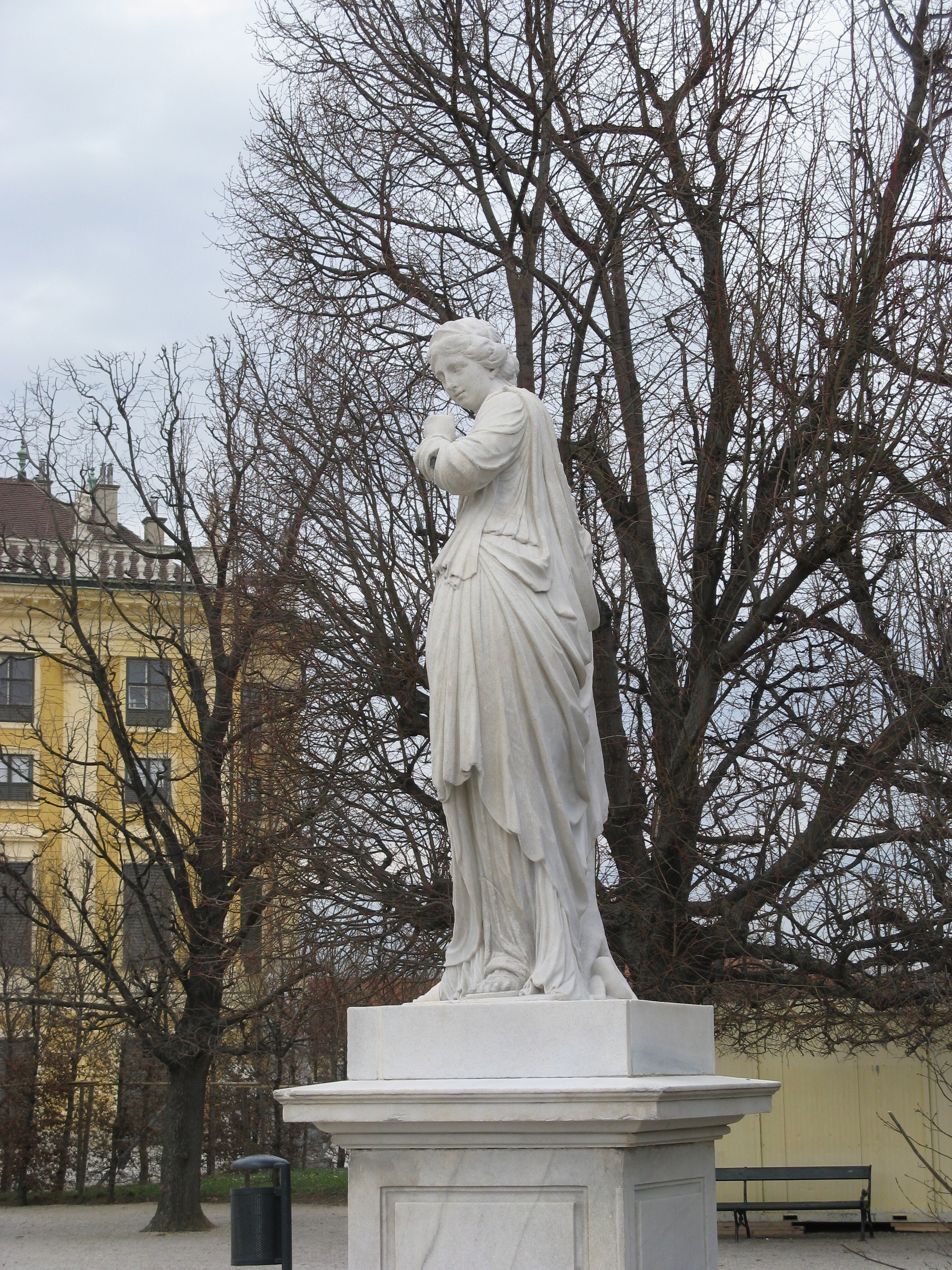
Statue of Angerona by Johann Christian Wilhelm Beyer, Schönbrunn Garden, Vienna, 1773–1780

His most important work was a contract for Maria Theresa issued in May 1773. Within three years, he was expected to produce a number of statues of white marble vases, for an amount of 1,000 florins per unit, excluding charges. As can be seen from the calculations, it was priced "per character", for statues of two or three figures was approximately several times charged.

After Beyer had received this order, one of his challenges was in the area around Sterzing to make quality marble which equaled that of Carrara. Already in the summer of 1773 Beyer was with a group of 15 sculptors at Sterzing. After his designs the figures were roughly hewn on site to reduce the weight for transportation. The blocks were placed on sleds in winter as far as the Brenner road from where Tyrolean carters it cost to Hall transported.

At Schönbrunn he was using the Winter Riding School (now a stable) as a studio. He focused on managing the organizational and design tasks. The price of the statues was the sculptor costing about half, and the remainder was retained for design and cost. Employees were not allowed to sign their work, so they are known simply as Beyers work in the majority of cases.

Four groups of figures for the planned four wells of the Great Parterre were started in 1776 (two in Beyer's studio, one at Hagenauer, one of Zauner), but had to be housed elsewhere because of the new MRP 1777: from Beyer's studio in the ruins and in the Obelisk Fountain, the other two wells in the Court of Honour.

Beyer's last great design for Schönbrunn were the figures for the 1780 Neptune Fountain, completed shortly before Maria Theresa's death.

== See also ==
- Sculptures in the Schönbrunn Garden
- Gardens of Schönbrunn Palace
