= Veliaj =

Veliaj is an Albanian surname. Notable people with the surname include:

- Emiliano Veliaj (born 1985), Albanian football midfielder
- Erion Veliaj (born 1979), Albanian politician

== See also ==
- Velia (given name)
