= Elea =

Elea may refer to:

== Greek-speaking cities and derived items ==
- "Elean", a common archaic adjective meaning someone from ancient Elis
- Elea, ancient name of an Italian-Greek colony, now known as Velia
  - Eleatics, a school of pre-Socratic philosophers at Elea
- Elea in Aeolis, an ancient Greek city in Turkey
- Elaea (Epirus), an ancient city in Greece in the regional unit of Thesprotia

=== Cypriot towns ===
- Elea, a city in Cyprus destroyed by earthquake in 343 AD, near modern Ayios Theodoros Karpasias
- Elia, Kyrenia, a settlement in Cyprus
- Elia, Nicosia, a settlement in Cyprus

== Other ==
- Olivetti Elea, a mainframe computer manufactured from 1959 through 1964
- Elea (bryozoan), an extinct genus in the order Cyclostomatida
- Elea, the personification of pity, mercy, clemency, and compassion

== See also ==
- Velia (disambiguation)
