= Gabrielle Bertrand (painter) =

Austrian painter (1737–1802)

- Born: Gabriel Margueritte Bertrand; 27 April 1737; Lunéville, Duchy of Lorraine, Holy Roman Empire
- Died: 11 April 1802 (aged 64); Vienna, Archduchy of Austria, Holy Roman Empire
- Education: Academy of Fine Arts Vienna
- Known for: Pastel portraits, portrait miniatures, genre scenes
- Spouse: Johann Wilhelm Beyer (m. 1771; div. 1785)
- Elected: Academy of Fine Arts Vienna (1771)

Gabrielle (or Gabriele) Bertrand (27 April 1737 – 11 April 1802), also known by her married name Gabrielle Beyer, was a pastel artist, miniaturist, and portrait and genre painter at the Habsburg court in Vienna. Born in Lunéville, then capital of the Duchy of Lorraine, she was brought to Vienna as a small child. She served the daughters of Empress Maria Theresa as a chambermaid and taught drawing and painting to the Archduchesses Maria Carolina and Marie Antoinette. In 1771, she became one of the few women admitted as a member of the Academy of Fine Arts Vienna.

Few of her works can be identified with certainty. Works by or attributed to her are held by the Wien Museum, the Academy of Fine Arts Vienna and Schönbrunn Palace.

== Life ==
=== Early life ===
Bertrand was born in Lunéville on 27 April 1737, and was baptised the following day at the Saint-Jacques church as Gabriel Margueritte. (Note: Older reference works, following Ignaz de Luca's Das gelehrte Oesterreich, gave her birth year as 1730, and Wurzbach (1856) gave her death as about 1790; Meyer's Conversations-Lexikon of 1845 gave 1737. Her baptismal record gives 27 April 1737, and the record of her death on 11 April 1802 gave her age as 65.) Her father was François-Gabriel Bertrand, an upholsterer (tapissier), and her mother was Élisabeth-Françoise Fricque. The family moved to Vienna in 1738, probably in connection with the 1736 marriage of Francis I, future Holy Roman Emperor, to Maria Theresa. Her father was Schlosshauptmann (German for 'castle steward') of Schloss Schönbrunn, sometimes referred to as the Emperor's gardener, from 1747 until his death in March 1765.

=== At court ===
Bertrand entered the imperial household as a chambermaid (Kammerdiener) to two of Maria Theresa's younger daughters, the archduchesses Maria Carolina and Marie Antoinette, and because of her talent she also gave them lessons in drawing and painting. (Note: Jeffares dates her teaching of the archduchesses from 1764. A 2015 Paris auction catalogue gives 1761 as the year she became their drawing teacher.) The Neue Deutsche Biographie, in its entry on her husband, differs from these sources, naming her as chambermaid to Archduchess Maria Elisabeth. On 7 December 1764 she was formally appointed as imperial-royal chambermaid with an annual salary of ƒ300.

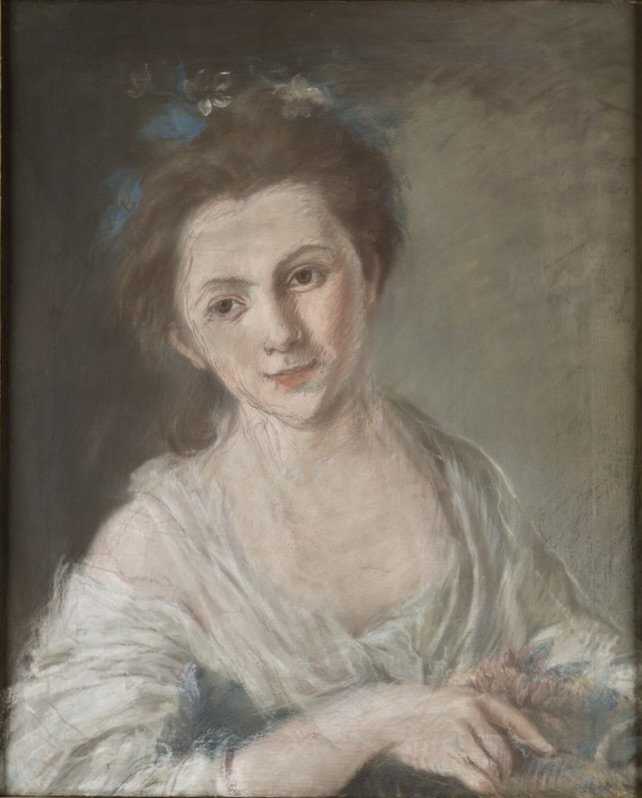
Girl with Flowers was one of her reception pieces for the Academy of Fine Arts Vienna.

=== Academy and marriage ===
In 1771 Bertrand was admitted as a full member of the Academy of Fine Arts, one of only a few women to do so. Her reception pieces were a posthumous portrait of Élisabeth Charlotte d'Orléans, Duchess of Lorraine and the mother of the late Emperor Francis I, as well as Girl with Flowers, which remains in the Academy's collection. She took part in the Academy's exhibitions of 1774, 1777, and 1786. In 1774 she showed pastel portraits at the exhibitions held in the Redoutensäle of the Hofburg; in 1777 she showed genre pieces and 'ideal heads', among them a Viennese servant girl, a peasant girl and boy, and a portrait of Anton Raphael Mengs; and in 1786 she exhibited a portrait of the writer Karoline Pichler.

Also in 1771 she married the sculptor, painter and garden architect Johann Wilhelm Beyer; he was over eleven years her senior. Beyer had been made court painter and sculptor in 1770, and has been credited with many of the statues in the gardens of Schönbrunn. The marriage was dissolved in 1785, after fourteen years.

=== Later life ===
Bertrand spent periods in Brussels and Naples. Pastels by her were recorded in Brussels in the collection of Prince Charles Alexander of Lorraine, governor of the Austrian Netherlands, and she left numerous pastel portraits in Vienna, Brussels, and Naples.

She died in Vienna on 11 April 1802, at Himmelpfortgasse 21.

== Work ==
Bertrand painted portraits, genre subjects and flowers, working chiefly in pastel; she also painted miniatures in watercolour and gouache, and painted on porcelain.

Much of her work was made for Empress Maria Theresa. By 1778 she had painted various pastels for the Empress's "so-called black cabinet" (German: sogenannte schwarze Kabinet), (Note: Not to be confused with the cabinet noir, a postal interception office.) a room that later sources say was at Schönbrunn Palace. The Wien Museum attributes a series of miniature watercolour death portraits from Maria Theresa's possession to Bertrand, among them portraits of the Empress's father, Charles VI, and of Maria Theresa's former governess, Countess Fuchs-Mollard, both dated 1765. The series also includes a death portrait of Maria Theresa herself, who died in 1780.

Countess von Fuchs-Mollard

Charles VI, on his Deathbed

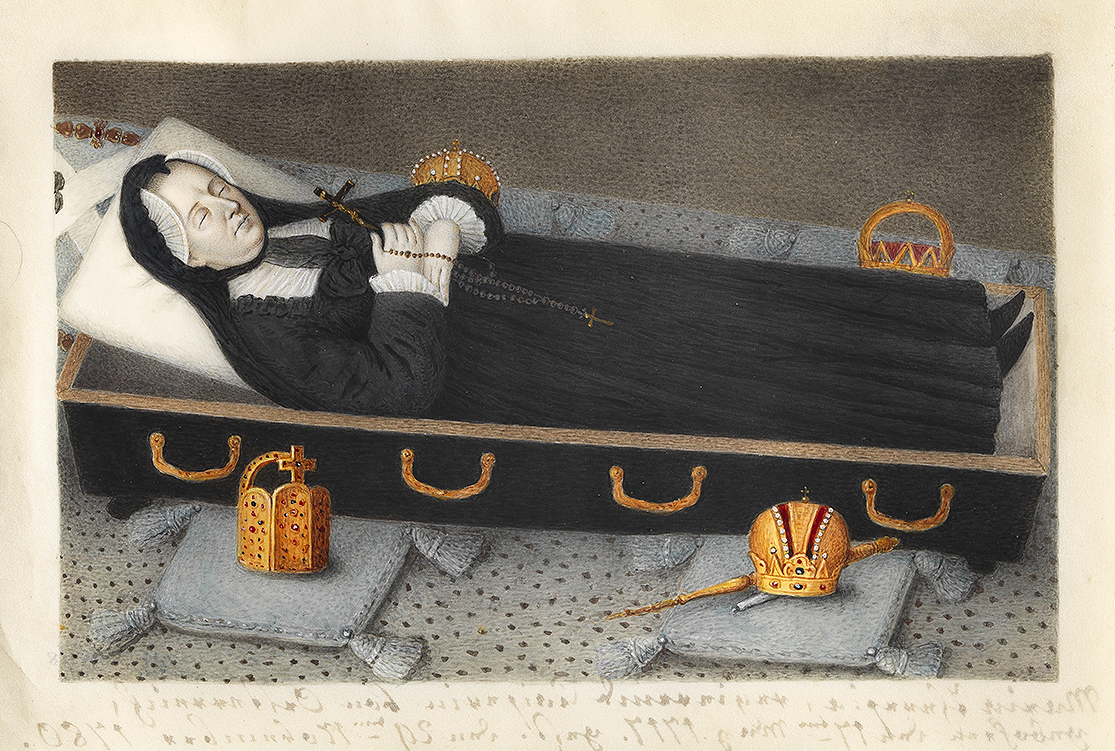
Maria Theresa, c. 1780

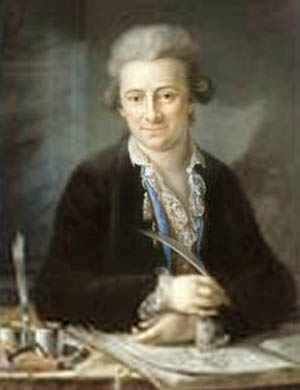
Johann Wilhelm Beyer, artist's husband

In February 1773 the court building commission ordered that fifteen panes of glass, bought by the Empress for pastel painting, be handed over to Bertrand, recorded under the name 'von Beyer' and the title Kammer-malerin (German for 'chamber painter (female)'). Among her pictures for the cabinet was a gouache miniature of Countess Fuchs-Mollard which is now in the Wien Museum.

For her former pupil Maria Carolina, by then Queen consort of Naples, Bertrand painted a portrait of her mother Maria Theresa "at the moment when she casts off mourning to take up the business of state". (Note: German: "im Momente, da sie den Trauerflor wegwirft und an die Staatsgeschäfte geht".)

=== Known works ===
Works confidently attributed to Bertrand include:

- Young Woman with a Flowered Hat, pastel, signed and dated 1767 (sold in Paris, 1999)
- Girl with Flowers, pastel on paper, 1771 (Academy of Fine Arts Vienna, inv. GG-185)
- Johann Wilhelm Beyer, pastel on paper, signed 'Peint par la Peyer née de Bertherand', c. 1775 (Wien Museum, inv. 103.222)
- Karoline von Greiner (later Karoline Pichler), pastel on card, 1785 (Wien Museum, inv. 17.953)

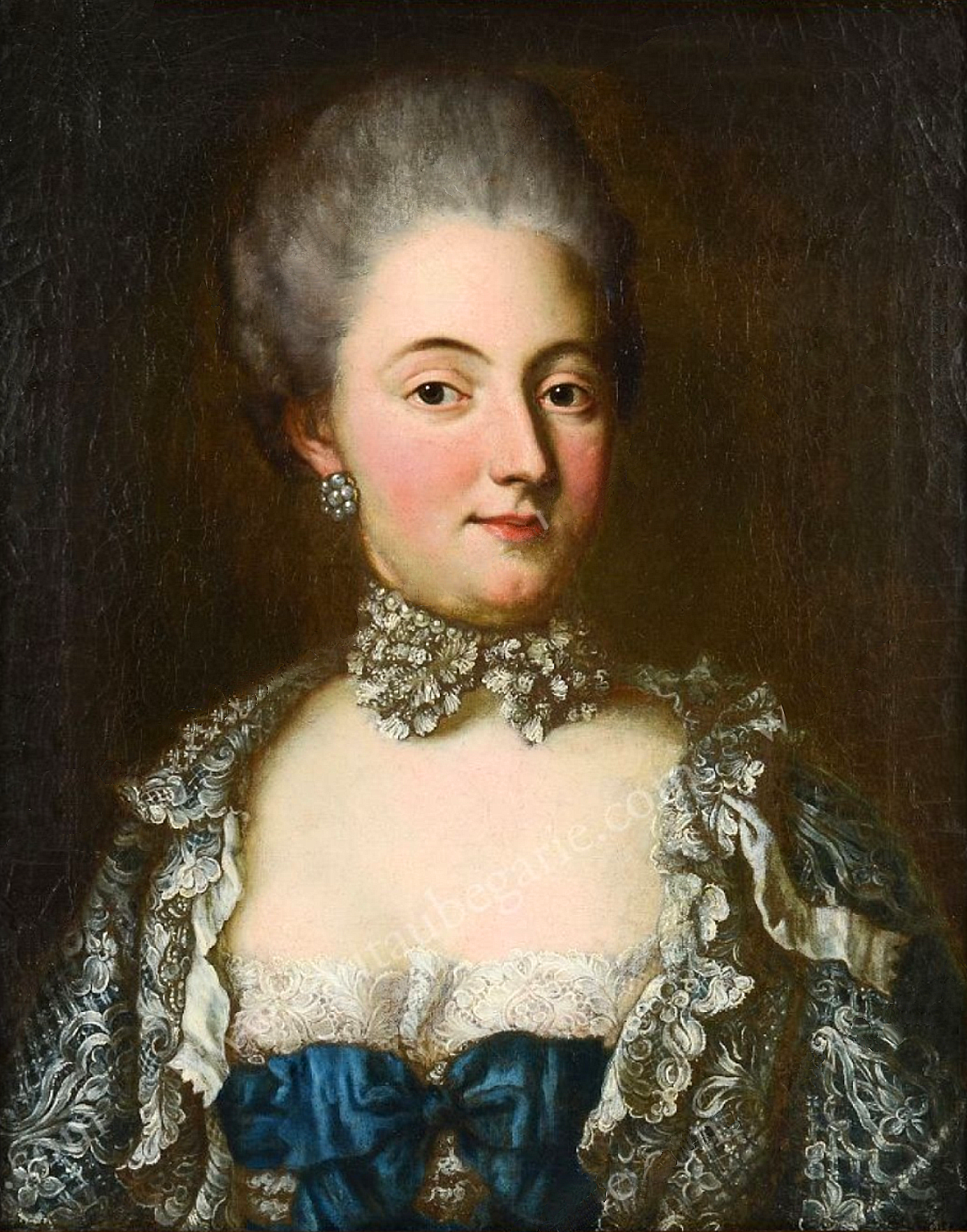
Portrait of a young woman, c. 1767, which is provisionally ascribed to Bertrand

=== Attributions ===
A portrait of an Archduchess c. 1767 was offered at auction in 2015 as a presumed portrait of Marie Antoinette, tentatively attributed to Bertrand.

A group of genre pastels from the Habsburg collections in Vienna, kept at Miramare Castle on the Gulf of Trieste from 1860 to 1919 as works by Jean-Étienne Liotard and now at Schönbrunn, has caused considerable confusion over attribution. In 2015 the pastel art historian Neil Jeffares proposed that many of them are by Bertrand. He cites the French traveller Alphonse de Fortia de Piles, who in 1790–1792 saw pastels "by Madame Beyer" in the imperial picture gallery – four portraits, including a Tyrolean man and woman, which he called fort bons (French for 'very good'); and a picture of children blowing soap bubbles – as well as Christian von Mechel's 1784 catalogue of the gallery in the Belvedere. The catalogue lists the two Tyrolean portraits in its 'White Cabinet' (French: Cabinet blanc) of pastels and miniatures, and mentions several other works by her there. Jeffares saw the influence of Liotard in three of the conversation pieces from the group, as well as that of François Boucher in another.
