= Sculptures in the Schönbrunn Garden =

Coordinates: 48°10′59″N 16°18′39″E

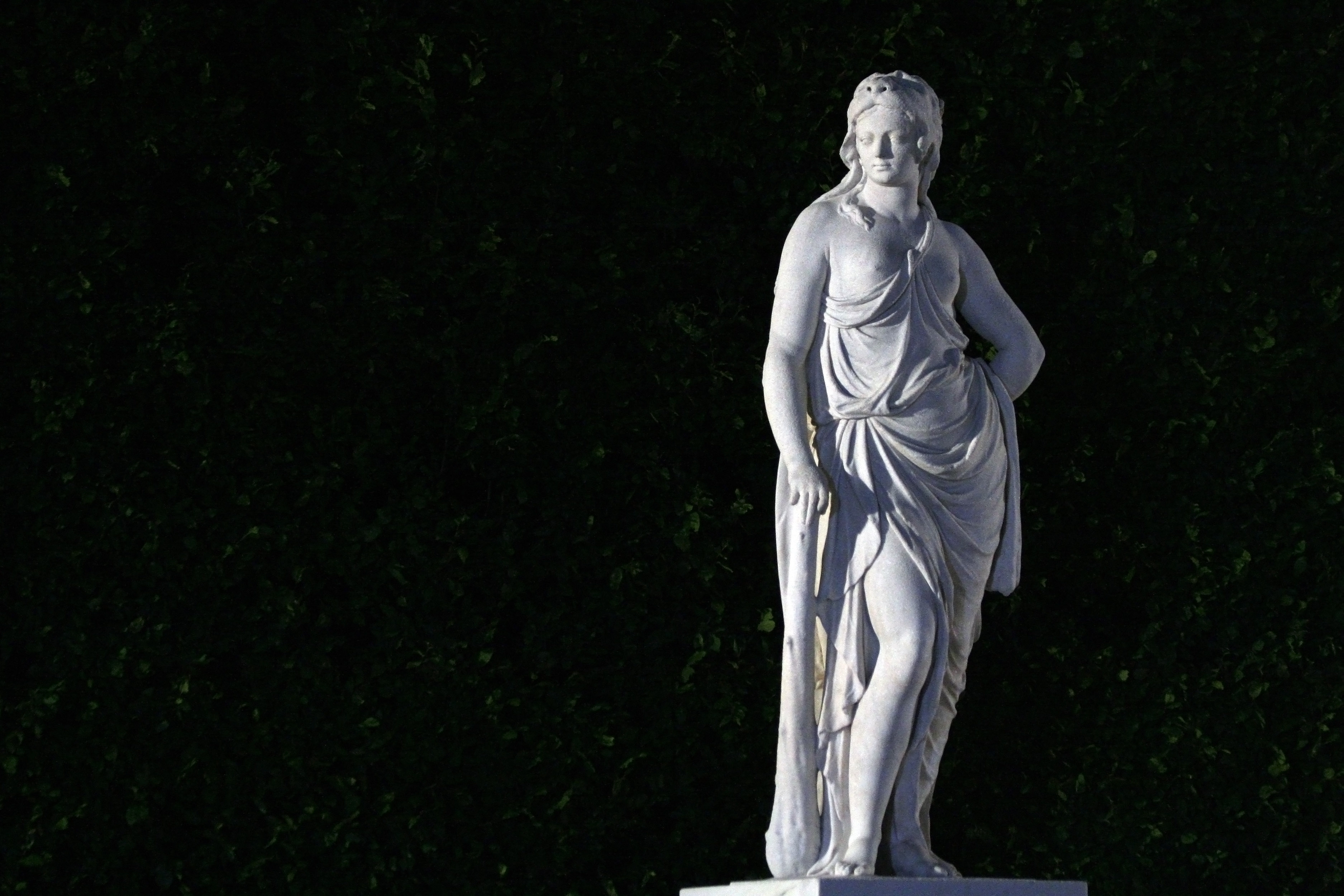
Statue of Omphale in the Schönbrunn Garden

The sculptures in the Schönbrunn Garden at Schönbrunn Palace in Vienna, Austria were created between 1773 and 1780 under the direction of Johann Wilhelm Beyer, a German artist and garden designer. The Great Parterre of Schönbrunn Garden is lined on both sides with 32 over life-size sculptures that represent mythological deities and virtues. The Neptune Fountain at the foot of the Gloriette hill is the crowning monument of the Great Parterre. Other sculptures are distributed throughout the garden and palace forecourt, including fountains and pools. Several sculptors were employed during the execution of these works, among them Johann Baptist Hagenauer.

== Great Parterre ==
No.	Title	Sculptor	Description	Image
1	Artemisia II of Caria	Jakob Schletterer, Johann Baptist Hagenauer	Artemisia II of Caria was the sister and wife of Mausolus, ruler of Caria. She was also his successor. Following the death of her brother/husband, in whose memory she built the Mausoleum at Halicarnassus, Artemisia reigned from 353 to 351 BC. Her administration followed the same principles as those of her husband, supporting the oligarchical party on the island of Rhodes.	
2	Calliope	Wilhelm Beyer	Calliope was the muse of epic poetry and the daughter of Zeus and Mnemosyne. She was Homer's muse and the inspiration for the epic poems Odyssey and Iliad.	
3	Brutus and Lucretia	Ignaz Platzer	Brutus was the founder of the Roman Republic and became one of the first Roman consuls in 509 BC after overthrowing the rule of the Etruscan kings of Rome. Brutus is shown holding the beautiful noblewoman Lucretia in his arm after she committed suicide. According to legend, she was raped by Sextus, the son of Etruscan King Lucius Tarquinius Superbus, and after revealing this to her husband, she killed herself with a dagger. The incident led to the insurrection led by Brutus. The story is the subject of William Shakespeare's poem The Rape of Lucrece.	
4	Ceres and Dionysus	Joachim Günther	Ceres was the goddess of agriculture, marriage, and death, representing the generative power of nature. She is shown with Dionysus, the god of the grape harvest, winemaking, and wine, and of ecstasy. He was the son of Zeus and Semele.	
5	Aeneas Escaping Troy	Philipp Jakob Prokop	Aeneas was the son of the prince Anchises and the goddess Aphrodite. His father was the second cousin of King Priam of Troy, making Aeneas Priam's second cousin, once removed. He is mentioned in Homer's epic poem Iliad, and in Roman mythology is the legendary founder of Ancient Rome. He is considered the first true hero of Rome. Aeneas is shown escaping from Troy.	
6	Angerona	Johann Wilhelm Beyer	Angerona was the goddess of anguish and fear who both produced anguish and fear in men, and relieved them from it. According to other sources, she was the goddess of silence who was introduced in Rome to prevent the "secret and sacred name of Rome being made known".	
7	Jason with the Golden Fleece	Johann Wilhelm Beyer	Jason was the heroic leader of the Argonauts and their quest for the Golden Fleece. The son of Aeson, the rightful king of Iolcos, Jason was married to the sorceress Medea. He appeared in the epic poem Argonautica and the tragedy Medea.	
8	Aspasia	Johann Wilhelm Beyer	Aspasia was a Milesian courtesan and lover of the Athenian statesman Pericles. She lived in Athens most of her life, and may have influenced Pericles and Athenian politics. She appears in the writings of Plato, Aristophanes, Xenophon, and other authors of that time. Aspasia and Pericles had a son, Pericles the Younger, who became a general in the Athenian military and was executed after the Battle of Arginusae. Following the death of Pericles, she became the courtesan of Lysicles, another Athenian statesman and general to whom she bore a son.	
9	Omphale	Joseph Anton Weinmüller	Omphale was the queen of the kingdom of Lydia in Asia Minor. She was the daughter of Iardanus (or Iardanes) and the wife of Tmolus, a king of Lydia from whom she inherited his throne. She purchased the hero Heracles after he was sent into servitude for one year by the Delphic Oracle for murdering Tiryns.	
10	Flora Nymph	Johann Wilhelm Beyer	Flora Nymph was associated with Flora, the goddess of flowers and spring, who was first given a temple in 238 BC near the Circus Maximus. Celebrations were held there in her honor every April. In Greek mythology, nymphs were young and beautiful female personifications of natural elements, such as rivers, trees, mountains, etc. These gentle beings enjoyed music and dancing and possessed some divine gifts, including the gift of prophecy.	
11	Maenad	Johann Wilhelm Beyer	Maenad were female followers of Dionysus, the most important members of the Thiasus, the god's retinue. During celebratory rites, they were inspired by Dionysus into a state of ecstatic frenzy, through a combination of dancing and intoxication. During these rites, the maenad dressed in fawn skins and carried thyrsus, long sticks wrapped in ivy or vine leaves and tipped with pinecones. They weaved ivy-wreaths around their heads or wore bull helmets in honor of their god, often handling or wearing snakes.	
12	Apollo	Johann Wilhelm Beyer	Apollo was the son of Zeus and Leto, and the twin brother of the chaste huntress Artemis. As a symbol of male beauty and moral excellence, he was associated with Greek culture and civilization and its ideal image of the beautiful, athletic, virtuous, and cultivated young man. Apollo is variously described as the god of light and sun, truth and prophecy, healing and plague, music and poetry, and more. Apollo was an oracular god and the prophetic deity of the Delphic Oracle.	
13	Hygieia	Joseph Baptist Hagenauer	Hygieia was the goddess of health and cleanliness. She was the daughter of Asclepius, the god of healing, and Epione, the goddess of soothing of pain. Hygieia had five sisters who also represented aspects of Apollo's healing: Panacea the goddess of universal remedy, Iaso the goddess of recuperation, Aceso the goddess of the healing process, and Aglaea the goddess of beauty.	
14	Vestal Virgin	Joseph Baptist Hagenauer and Leonhard Posch	Vestal Virgins were virgins who represented the early Roman kings in the Roman religion. They were responsible for watching over the fire of the state hearth in the temple of Vesta, the goddess of the hearth. Chosen from patrician families by the high priest Pontifex Maximus, these young girls, aged 6–10, were required to serve their goddess in celibacy for thirty years. They lived in the House of the Vestals (Atrium Vestae) behind the Temple of Vesta (Aedes Vestae) near the Roman Forum. They wore linen dresses in the old style and were highly regarded for their purity and their intervention on behalf of those in trouble. Any Vestal found guilty of unchaste behavior was entombed alive.	
15	Paris	Veit Königer	Paris was the son of Priam, king of Troy, and his wife Hecuba. He appears in several Greek legends and in Virgil's epic poem Aeneid. Sent by his father as an ambassador to Sparta, Paris fell in love and eloped with Helen, queen of Sparta, which caused the Trojan War. After the Spartans arrived in Troy, Menelaus, king of Sparta, challenged Paris to a duel for Helen's return. Paris was soundly beaten by the king and was saved at the last minute by Aphrodite spirits. Later, Paris, who was a skilled archer, fatally wounded Achilles in the heel with an arrow that was guided by Apollo.	
16	Hannibal	Joseph Baptist Hagenauer	Hannibal was the great military leader of the Carthaginians against Rome in the Second Punic War. He was the son of Hamilcar Barca, a general and statesman of Carthage, who took him to Spain in 237 BC and forced him to swear eternal hatred against Rome. After becoming commander-in-chief, Hannibal expanded Cathage's territory in Spain at the expense of Rome's allies. In 209 BC, he boldly invaded Italy and perpetuated war against the Romans for sixteen years before being called back to Africa to defend Carthage. After being defeated by Scipio Africanus at Zama in 203 BC, he urged an immediate truce with Rome. Following the conclusion of the treaty in 201 BC, he enacted reforms that weakened the power of the oligarchs in Carthage. Following a final naval defeat at Side in 190 BC, he fled to Crete and then to Bithynia, where he committed suicide by poison around 183 BC.	
17	Meleager	Johann Wilhelm Beyer	Meleager was the son of Oeneus, the king of Calydon, and Althaea. When Meleager was born, the Fates declared he would live until a brand, burning in the family hearth, was consumed by fire. Althaea took the brand from the hearth and carefully preserved it. Years later, when Meleager was a young man, his father neglected to offer a sacrifice to Artemis at a festival, and in anger, the goddess sent a large boar to ravage Calydon. Oeneus instructed Meleager to bring together heroes from all over Greece to hunt the boar that was terrorizing their land. Among these heroes, Meleager chose Atalanta, a fierce huntress, whom he loved. When two centaurs, Hylaeus and Rhaecus, tried to rape Atalanta, Meleager killed them. During the hunt, Atalanta wounded the boar, and later Meleager killed it, awarding her the hide because she drew the first drop of blood. When Althaea heard about her son's killing of the centaurs, she burned the brand, and Meleager soon died. The story appears in Homer's epic poem Iliad (IX, 529–99).	
18	Mercury	Ignaz Platzer	Mercury was the god of eloquent speech and was often shown wearing a winged hat and shoes, and carrying a caduceus or herald's staff with two entwined snakes. The son of Maia and Jupiter, the god of trade and the primary god of the Roman state religion, Mercury gave his name to the element "mercury" because of his apparent swiftness and speed. He was also thought of as a mediator between human and divine wisdom.	
19	Priestess	Joseph Anton Weinmüller	Priestesses and priests were appointed by the assembly to serve specific gods and goddesses, to perform rites and sacrifices, and to instruct worshippers on various rituals. This priestess is shown holding a bowl for libation.	
20	Cumaean Sibyl	Johann Wilhelm Beyer, Vinzenz Lang, and Joseph Baptist Hagenauer	Cumaean Sibyl was a priestess and prophet presiding over the Apollonian oracle at the Greek colony of Cumae, near present-day Naples, Italy. Considered to be the most famous Sibyl in antiquity, Cumaean Sibyl appears in Virgil's epic poem Aeneid (VI). The cave she lived in still survives. She inscribed her prophecies in palm leaves. Cumaean Sibyl is depicted in several important paintings and frescoes, including those in Santa Maria della Pace by Raphael and on the Sistine Chapel ceiling by Michelangelo.	
21	Asclepius	Veit Königer	Asclepius was the god of healing. He was the son of Apollo, who was also a healing god, and the mortal Coronis, the daughter Phlegyas. When he discovered his wife was unfaithful, Apollo killed Coronis but saved the unborn child Asclepius, who was later taught medicine by the centaur Chiron. Answering the prayers of the goddess Artemis, Asclepius brought Hippolytus back to life. Zeus was angered by Asclepius' actions and killed him with a thunderbolt. In turn, Apollo killed Cyclops, who had provided the thunderbolt. In Homer's epic poem Iliad, Asclepius is the father of the Greek physicians at the siege of Troy, Machaon and Podaleirius.	
22	Ceres Priestess	Joseph Baptist Hagenauer	Ceres was a Roman divinity who represented the generative power of nature. Associated with the earth goddess Tellus, Ceres was worshipped in Rome from ancient times. Her cult on Aventine Hill in Rome was her most famous. Her temple there was completed in 493 BC and soon became a center of plebeian life. Following a funeral, mourners would offer sacrifices to Ceres as a way of purifying the home of the deceased.	
23	Ceres Priestess	Joseph Baptist Hagenauer		
24	Heracles	Ignaz Platzer	Heracles was the most famous of all the Greek heroes. Descended from Perseus and the son of Zeus and Alcmena, Heracles was renowned for his strength and courage, as well as his good nature and compassion. Considered a common source of help, his name was invoked on all occasions. Heracles also served as an ideal of human behavior, acting for the benefit of mankind. As an infant, he killed the two snakes sent by Hera to kill him. He studied the arts from the greatest experts, including archery from Eurytus, wrestling from Autolycus, weaponry from Polydeuces, and music from Linus.	
25	Perseus	Johann Wilhelm Beyer	Perseus was the son of Zeus and Danaë. He also killed the gorgon Medusa, sister of Stheno and Euryale, with Hermes' flying shoes and a shield made of reflecting metal. He needed the shield to kill the gorgon, elseway he had to look at her and would have turned to stone.	
26	Quintus Fabius Maximus Verrucosus	Joseph Baptist Hagenauer	Quintus Fabius Maximus Verrucosus (c. 280 BC – 203 BC) was a Roman politician and general who was Roman Consul five times and Roman Dictator twice. As a military strategist, he became known as Cunctator (delayer) for the tactics he employed during the Second Punic War. He is widely considered the father of guerrilla warfare for targeting enemy supply lines while facing a vastly superior enemy—a novel strategy at the time.	
27	Flora	Johann Wilhelm Beyer	Flora was the goddess of flowers and spring, who was first given a temple in 238 BC near the Circus Maximus. Celebrations were held there in her honor every April.	
28	Abduction of Helena	Johann Wilhelm Beyer	Helen of Troy was the wife of King Menelaus of Sparta, the younger brother of Agamemnon. Known for her great beauty, Helen was taken to Attica in her youth by Theseus, but was rescued by her brothers and taken back to Sparta, where she was courted by the greatest men in Greece. She chose Menelaus as her husband, and soon bore him a daughter, Hermione. When Paris was sent as an ambassador to Sparta by his father, he fell in love and eloped with Helen, which caused the Trojan War. After the Spartans arrived in Troy, Menelaus, challenged Paris to a duel for Helen's return. Paris was soundly beaten by the king and was saved at the last minute by Aphrodite spirits. After the war, Menelaus found Helen in Egypt and brought her back to Sparta. In Greek mythology, Helen was the daughter of Zeus and Leda. According to the myth, Zeus visited Leda in the form of a swan, producing an egg from which Helen was hatched.	
29	Janus and Bellona	Johann Wilhelm Beyer	Janus was the god of gates, doorways, and beginnings in the Roman religion. He is often depicted having two faces because he looked to both the past and the future. The first month of the Roman calendar (Ianuarius or January) was named in his honor. Janus is shown standing with Bellona, the Roman goddess of war, and according to various accounts the wife or sister of Mars. The first temple dedicated to her was built in the Campus Martius near the Circus Flaminius by Appius Claudius Caecus in 296 BC during the war against the Etruscans.	
30	Mars and Minerva	Veit Königer	Mars and Minerva	
31	Amphion	Joseph Baptist Hagenauer	Amphion was the son of Zeus by Antiope. After she was raped by Zeus, Antiope fled to Sicyon and married King Epopeus. She was later captured by Nycteus or Lycus and taken back to Thebes. Along the way she gave birth to the twins and was forced to leave them on Mount Cithaeron. After being enslaved by Lycus and his wife Dirce, who treated her cruelly for many years, Antiope escaped and eventually found her sons, who avenged her captivity by killing Dirce—tying her to the horns of a bull. Amphion and Zethus went on to conquer Thebes, where they ruled together. Amphion became a great singer and musician after Hermes taught him to play and gave him a golden lyre. He and his brother built the walls around the Cadmea, the citadel of Thebes. Amphion's musical skill was so great that when played his lyre, the stones simply moved into place.	
32	Gaius Mucius Scaevola	Johann Martin Fischer	Gaius Mucius Scaevola was a legendary Roman youth known for his bravery. During the siege of Rome by King Lars Porsena of Clusium at the end of the sixth century BC, Scaevola entered the enemy's camp and attempted to kill the king. When he was taken prisoner and threatened with death, Scaevola placed his right hand into a fire to show his indifference to death. Porsena was so impressed he freed the brave youth, who took on the cognomen Scaevola meaning "left-handed".	

== Neptune Fountain ==
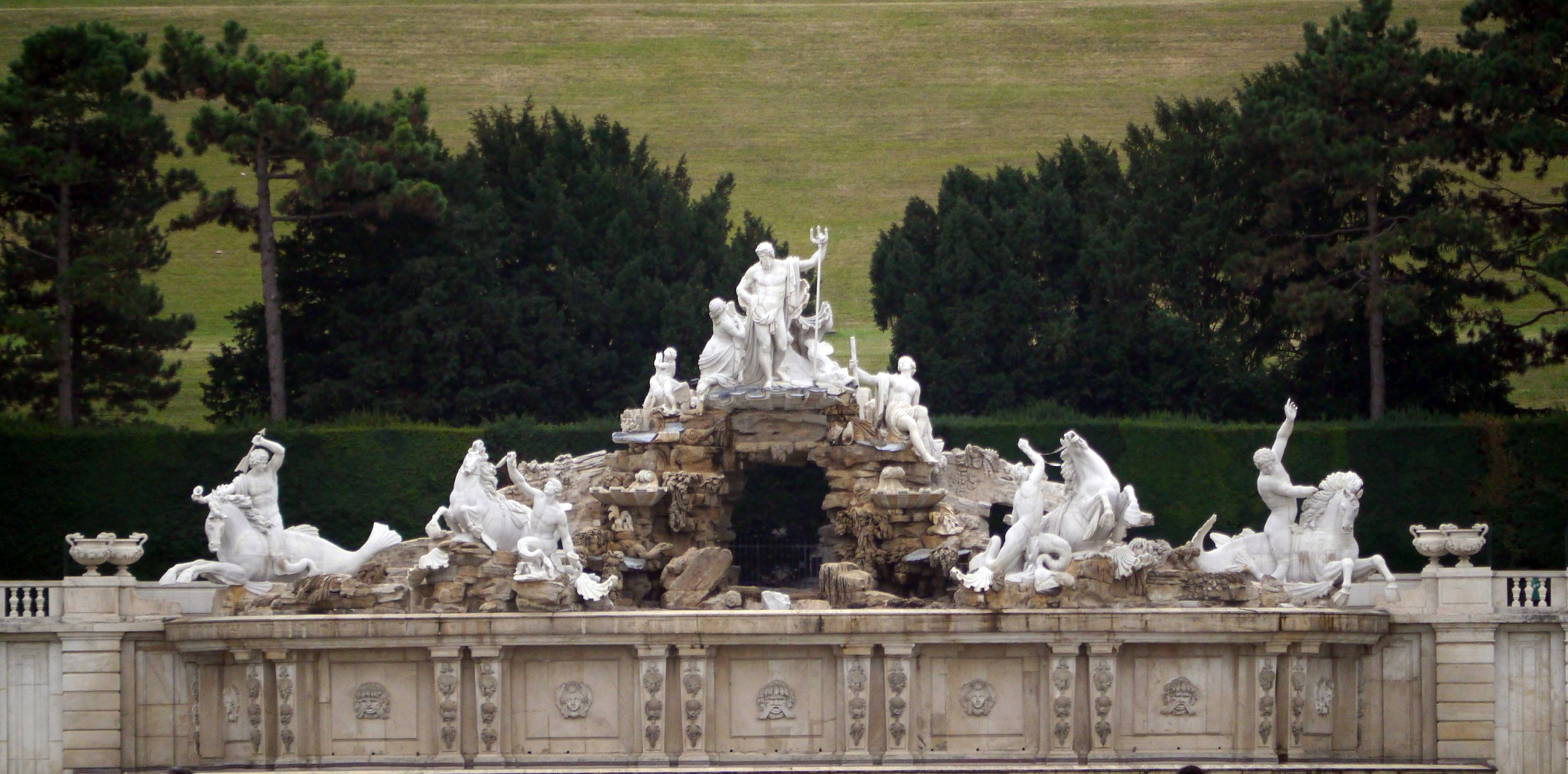
Neptune Fountain in the Schönbrunn Garden

The Neptune Fountain at the foot of the Gloriette hill was designed to be the crowning monument of the Great Parterre. Commissioned by Empress Maria Theresa, work on the fountain began in 1776 and was completed within four years, just prior to the death of the empress. The overall design was done by Johann Ferdinand Hetzendorf von Hohenberg; the marble sculptural group was executed by Wilhelm Beyer.

The retaining wall of the Neptune Fountain merges into the slope of the Gloriette hill and includes a balustrade adorned with ornate vases. From a projecting semi-oval plinth, a rocky formation emerges with the sea-god Neptune and his entourage. The plinth is segmented by panels decorated with masks and separated and embellished with garlands. Neptune stands atop the grotto at the center of the figure group in a shell-shaped chariot holding a trident. A nymph is seated to his left. The sea-goddess Thetis kneels to his right, asking the sea god to favor her son Achilles on his voyage to Troy.

Appearing at the base of the grotto are four tritons—creatures who are half-man and half-fish—who are part of the sea-god's entourage. Each holds a conch shell trumpet with which they can inspire fear. They are restraining the sea-horses who draw Neptune's chariot across the seas. This image of Neptune commanding the watery dominion was a common symbol in sixteenth, seventeenth, and eighteenth-century art, to represent monarchs controlling the fate of their people. In the nineteenth century, a bank of evergreen trees was planted behind the white figural group to provide a dark contrast.

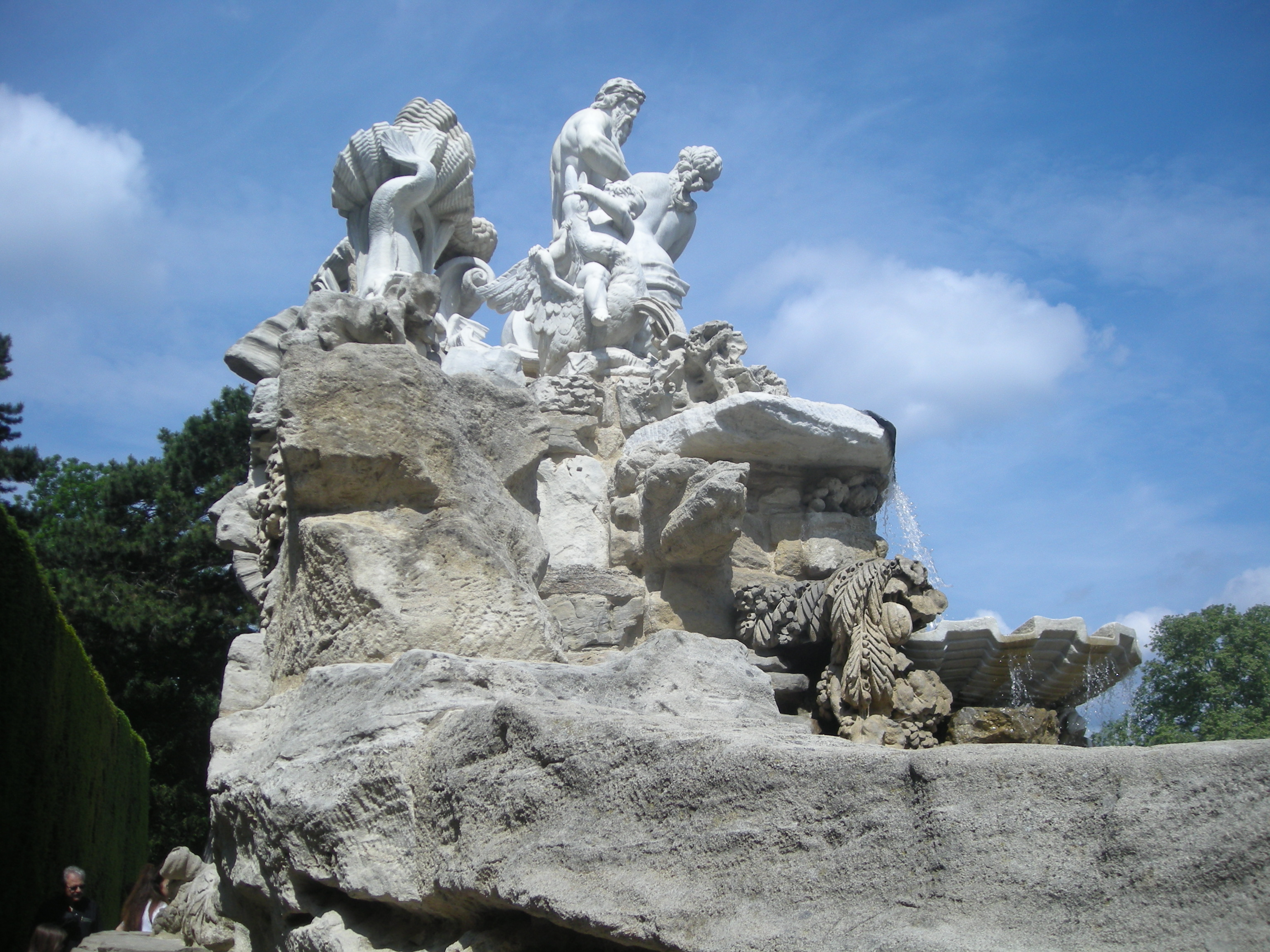
Neptune and Thetis

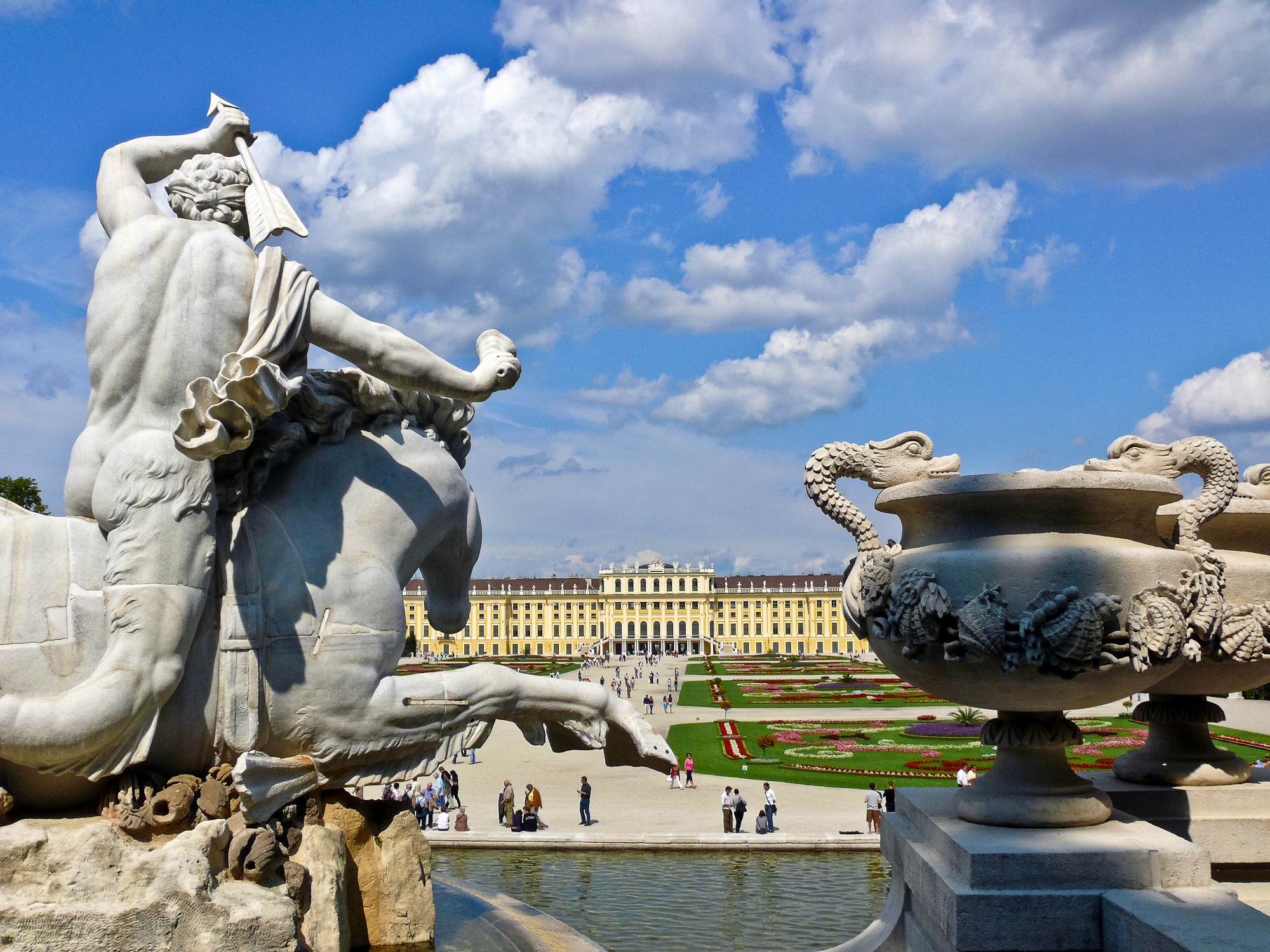
Triton

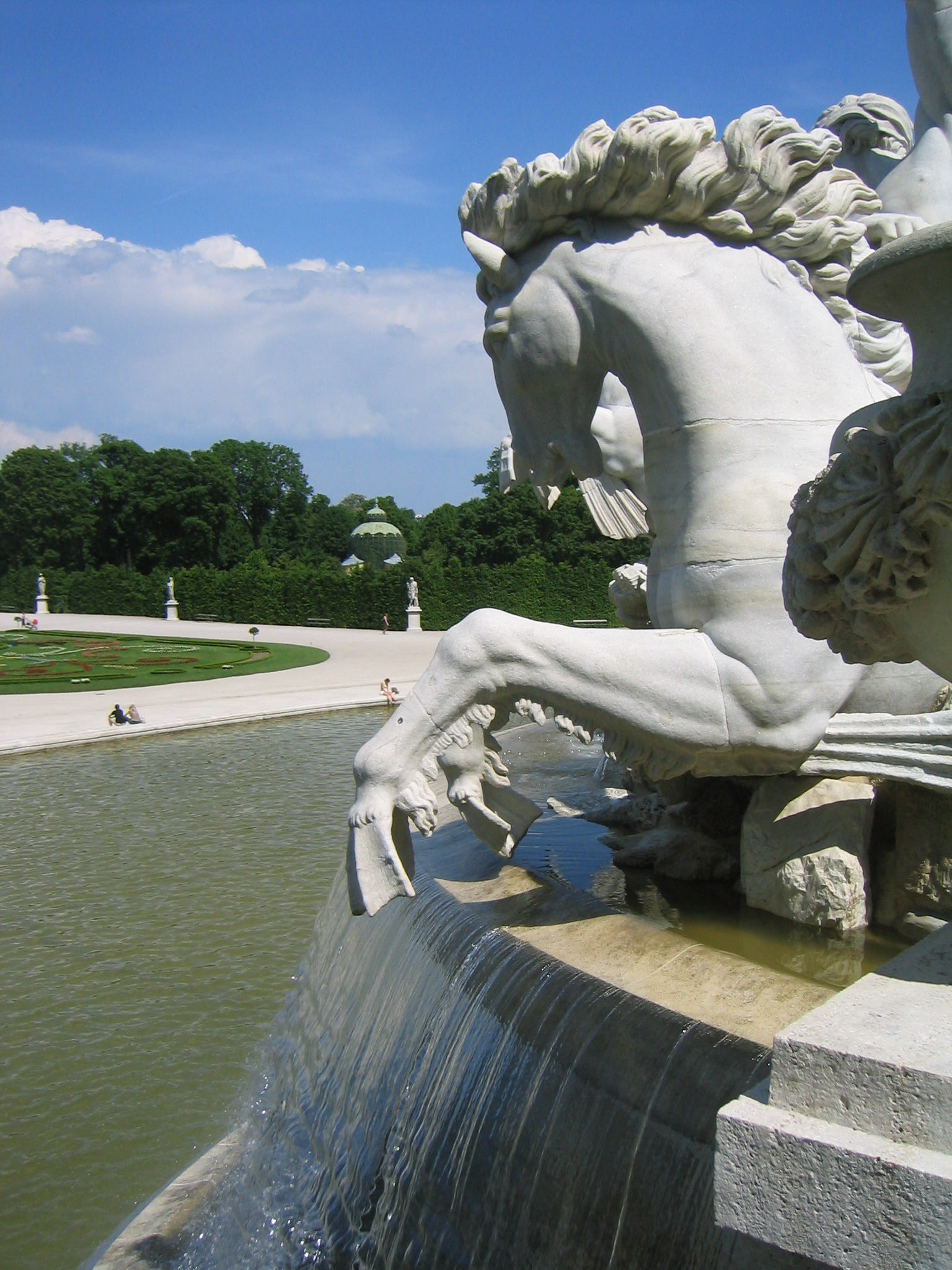
Sea-horse

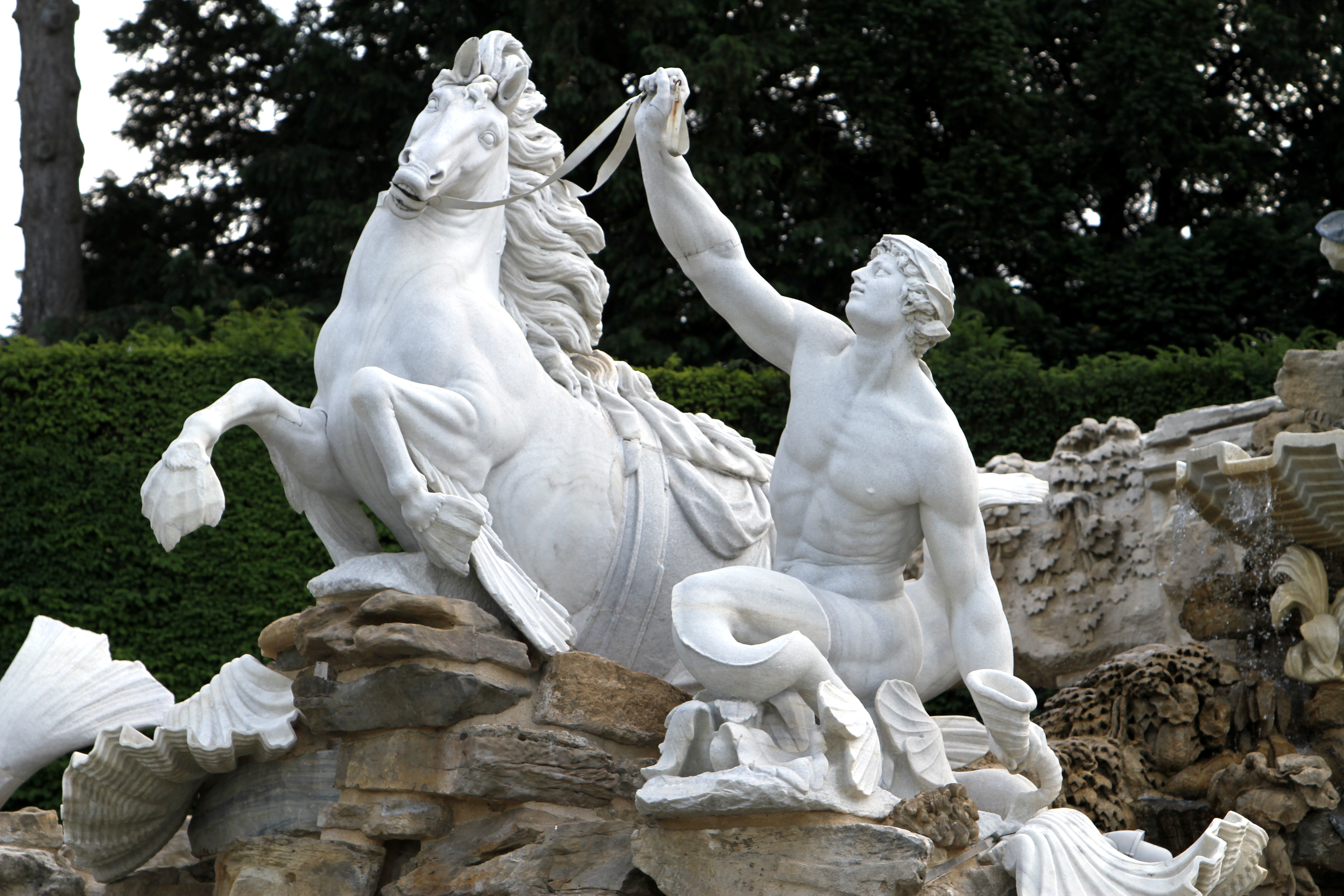
Triton

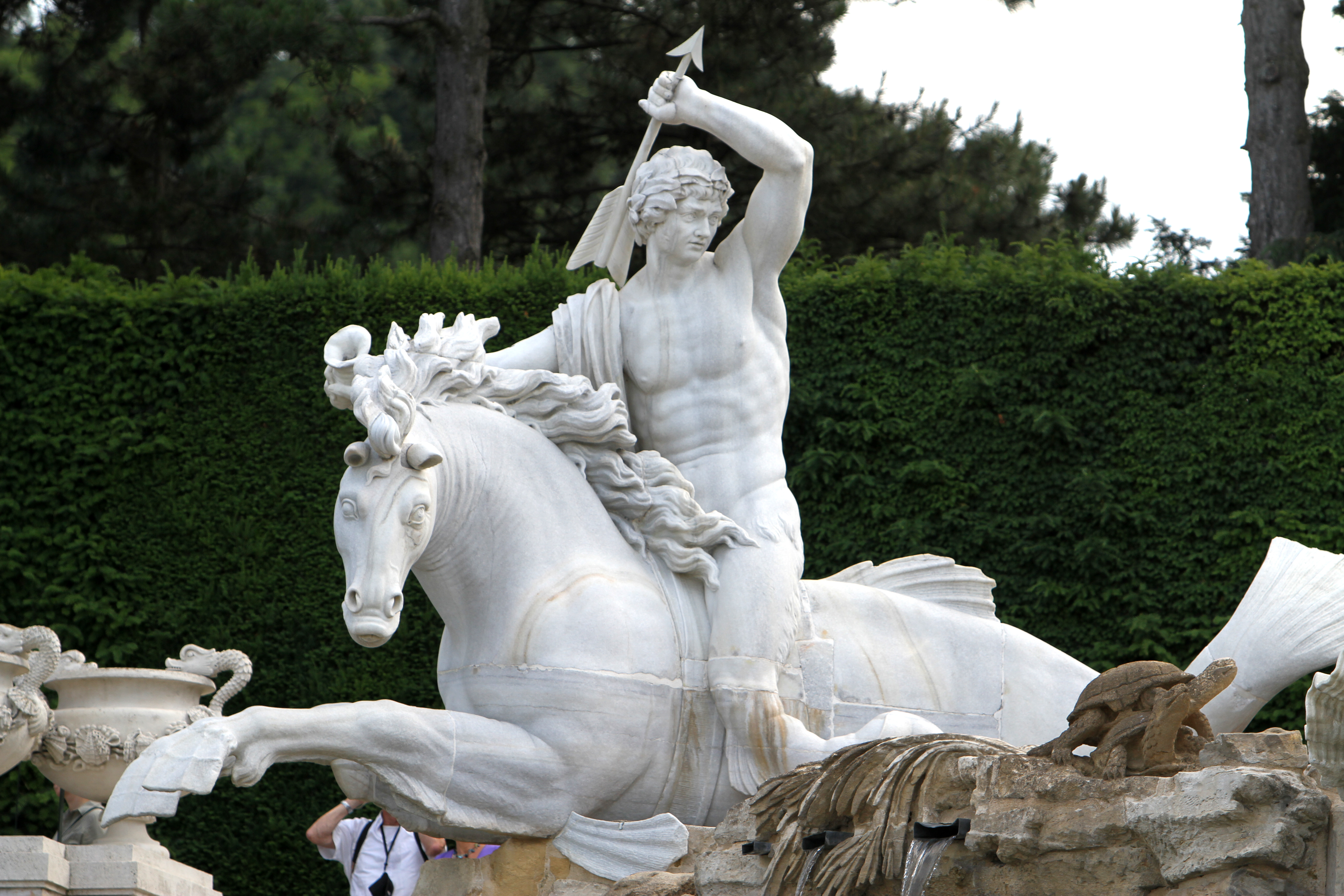
Triton

== Other sculptures ==
No.	Title	Sculptor	Description	Image
33	Alexander and Olympias	Johann Wilhelm Beyer	Alexander the Great and Olympias	
34	Family Monument to Maria Carolina of Austria	Franz Thaler	Maria Carolina of Austria	
35	Hesperia and Arethusa	Joseph Baptist Hagenauer	Hesperia and Arethusa	
36	Roman Matron	Joseph Baptist Hagenauer		
37	Heracles with Three-headed Cerebus		Heracles	
38	Schöner Brunnen	Johann Wilhelm Beyer	The original well house at this location was built by the court gardener Steckhoven. In 1771, it was replaced by a square pavilion designed by Isidor Canevale, the court architect. The pavilion contains open semi-circular arches at the front and back of the structure. The back arch frames the figure of Egeria seated above a small shell basin. She is holding a vase under her right arm, and from that vase flows spring water. Egeria was a water-nymph to whom pregnant women offered sacrifices to ensure easy births. She was also the divine consort and counselor of Numa Pompilius, the second king of Rome, to whom she gave laws and rituals pertaining to the ancient Roman religion. Her name is an eponym for female advisor or counselor. The work was executed by Johann Wilhelm Beyer. The corners of the room are decorated with sculpted sheaves of reeds, and the ceilings are embellished with flowers. A stone plaque bearing the initial "M" commemorates Emperor Matthias, who discovered at this site the Schöner Brunnen (Beautiful Fountain).	
39	Cincinnatus	Johann Wilhelm Beyer	Cincinnatus	
40	Angels Fountain		Angels Fountain was created between 1773 and 1780, and was restored in 1949. At that time, the heads of the cherubs and the drapery were replaced. In 1994, the original helicoidal pool was replaced by the pink marble pool. The original pool was restored in the foyer of the palace.	
41	Persecuted Eurydice	Johann Wilhelm Beyer, Sebastian Pfaff	The persecuted Eurydice is shown looking back in fear, as she tries to kill a poisonous snake at her feet.	
42	Round Pool	Joseph Baptist Hagenauer		
43	Star Pool	Joseph Baptist Hagenauer		
44	Apollo	Joseph Baptist Hagenauer		
45	Diana	Joseph Baptist Hagenauer		
46	Japanese Garden			
47	Monument to Emperor Francis I		Francis I, Holy Roman Emperor	
48	Monument to Emperor Joseph II		Joseph II, Holy Roman Emperor	
49	Monument to Maximilian I of Mexico		Maximilian I of Mexico	
50	Fish Pool			
51	Diana and Meleager	Johann Wilhelm Beyer	The statues are located in the Hietzinger Privy Gardens, the private garden of emperor Franz Josephs.	
52	Fountains in the Forecourt	Franz Anton von Zauner, Joseph Baptist Hagenauer		
52	Fountains in the Forecourt	Franz Anton von Zauner, Joseph Baptist Hagenauer		
53	Sphinxes Outside the Palace	Johann Wilhelm Beyer	The statues are located outside the palace, across from the main entrance.	
54	Lions Outside the Palace	Johann Wilhelm Beyer	The statues are located outside the palace, across from the main entrance.	
55	Sphinxes on Maria Theresa Gate			

== Locations ==
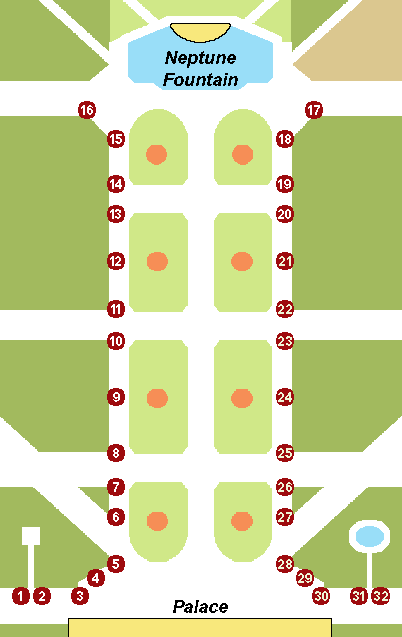
Great Parterre showing the locations of 32 over life-size sculptures that line both sides

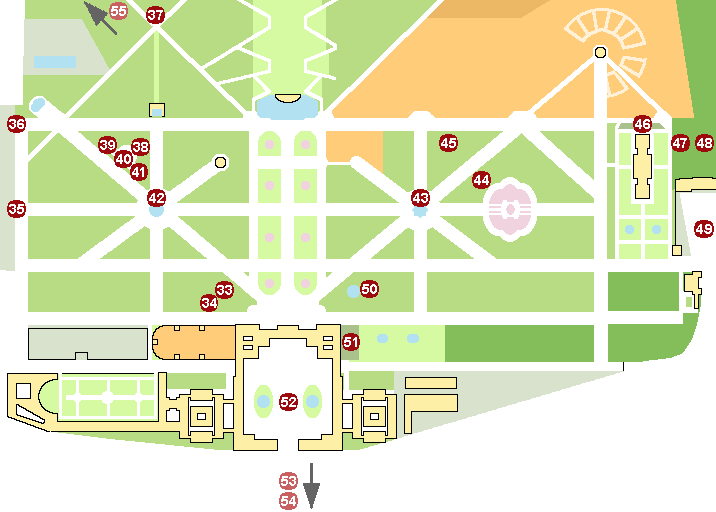
Other areas showing the locations of 23 additional sculptures

== See also ==
- Culture of Austria
- List of gardens
- List of statues
