= Velia (given name) =

Velia is a feminine given name. Notable people with the name include:

- Velia Aguilar Armendáriz (born 1960), Mexican politician
- Velia Eguiluz (born 1965), Mexican beach volleyball player
- Velia Ercole (1903–1978), Australian novelist
- Velia Fowler, American cell biologist
- Velia Martínez (1920–1993), American actress
- Velia Vidal (born 1982), Colombian activist and writer
