= Orbona =

Orbona (/orˈboː.na/; Latin: [ɔrˈboːnä]) is the Roman goddess who protects parents who are bereaved of their children and parents of ill children. The first mention of Orbona is unknown. She appears in the Arnobius Against The Heathen V4 written by Arnobius. Said Orbona is the goddess who takes care of parents who are bereaved of their children. There is no description of the appearance or related presence in the Roman mythology. Orbona is a unique figure in Roman religion. She stands apart and does not derive directly from any Greek goddess. Her name is barely seen in the present because she has a particular role to protect only the father and mother who lose their child to death.

== Etymology ==
The name Orbona is from the Latin from orbus ("bereft") + -ōna ("epithets of female deities"). The word orbus is from Proto-Indo-Eurupean *h₃erbʰ- ("orphan"). Cognate with Ancient Greek ὀρφανός (orphanós, "orphaned"). Meaning related to bereaved, bereft, deprived by death which refers to orphaned, parentless, fatherless, childless, widowed.

== Origins ==
The first mention of Orbona is unknown. She appear in the Arnobius Against The Heathen V4 written by Arnobius, a Christian apologist from the 4th century. Said Orbona is the goddess take care parents who bereaved of their children. There are interpretations from other writings that Orbona was a goddess invoked by father and mother, for the preservation of their children and those who lose them were under particular protection of her. In other writings it has been interpreted that the offering were not intended for the soul of the decreased, but for the safety of remaining children or for the conception of additional ones. Also, parents of ill children prayed to Orbona too. In some writing, there is a mention of Orbona alongside deities like Febris, goddess of fever and Mala Fortuna, goddess of bad luck. Which indicates that she might have had a darker or more ominous aspect in Roman belief.

== Presence in mythology ==
Orbona is a sub deity in Roman mythology. Unlike other deities, her presence is absent in Roman mythology. She was more of a protective figure in rituals related to childbirth and mourning. Her role highlights the everyday realities of child loss in ancient Roman society, even if she does not have extensive stories or myths attributed to her.

All mentioned in the writings about Orbona is in the same direction that she takes a particular duty to protect the father and mother who bereaved of their children. The temple of Orbona is mentioned in the Natural History written by Pliny the Elder, a Roman author, who said it was located near the Temple of the Lares to relieve disease at that time. At present, the Temple of the Lares is part of the archaeological area of the Roman Forum.

== Modern Interpretations ==
The word "Orbona" appears in some modern media like The Search for WondLa which is the name of the planet, or the HBO drama series Rome tells the story of two soldiers named Lucius Vorenus and Titus Pullo, who find their lives intertwined with key historical events. Even though her presence is barely seen in the present, her name still associated with Roman mythology.

In Tony DiTerlizzi's children novel The Search for WondLa, Orbona is the name of the planet that serves as the setting for the story. The human girl, Eva Nine carries out a perilous search for others human, accompanied by a caretaker robot and two friendly denizens of the planet. This relates to the goddess Orbona from Roman myths because she is an orphan, though accompanied by a robot she calls Muthr who has raised her in the underground sanctuary, and she wanted to find others like her- like a parent who wants a child, or vice versa.

In the HBO drama series Rome, the goddess is mentioned as the Blessed Orbona by Lyde after she joins the temple.
