= Pellonia (deity) =

In Roman mythology, Pellonia was a goddess who was believed to protect people from their enemies by driving the latter off.

Her name likely derives from Latin pello "to hit, push, thrust off".
