= Velia Fowler =

American cell biologist and biochemist

Velia M. Fowler is an American cell biologist and biochemist specializing in the cytoskeleton. She is a professor and chair of the Department of Biological Sciences at the University of Delaware.

== Early life and education ==
Fowler obtained her Bachelor of Arts from Oberlin College in 1974 and her PhD from Harvard University in 1980. While working on her PhD, she was named a National Science Foundation Predoctoral Fellow.

== Career and research ==
Fowler was a Jane Coffin Childs Postdoctoral Fellow from 1980 to 1982 at the Johns Hopkins School of Medicine under the mentorship of Dr. Vann Bennett. She remained at Johns Hopkins for two more years as a research associate before becoming an assistant professor of Anatomy and Cell Biology at Harvard Medical School in 1984. From 1987 to 2018, Fowler led a research group at Scripps Research, serving as an Associate Dean for Graduate Studies starting in 2013 and the acting Chair of the Department of Cell and Molecular Biology from 2014 to 2015. In 2018, she became the Chair of the Department of Biological Sciences at the University of Delaware.

Fowler has served as an editorial board member at the Journal of Biological Chemistry since 2012, and an associate editor at the same journal since 2013.

Fowler's research has focused on the formation and shape of red blood cells as influenced by their cytoskeleton, specifically actin and myosin. She also studies the role of actin in eye lens function.

== Awards and honors ==
Selected awards:

- National Science Foundation Predoctoral Fellowship Award (1975–1978)
- Jane Coffin Childs Foundation Postdoctoral Fellowship Award (1980–1982)
- NIH New Investigator Research Grant Award (1983–1984)
- American Heart Association Established Investigator Award (1990–1995)
