= Velia Vidal =

Colombian writer and cultural activist

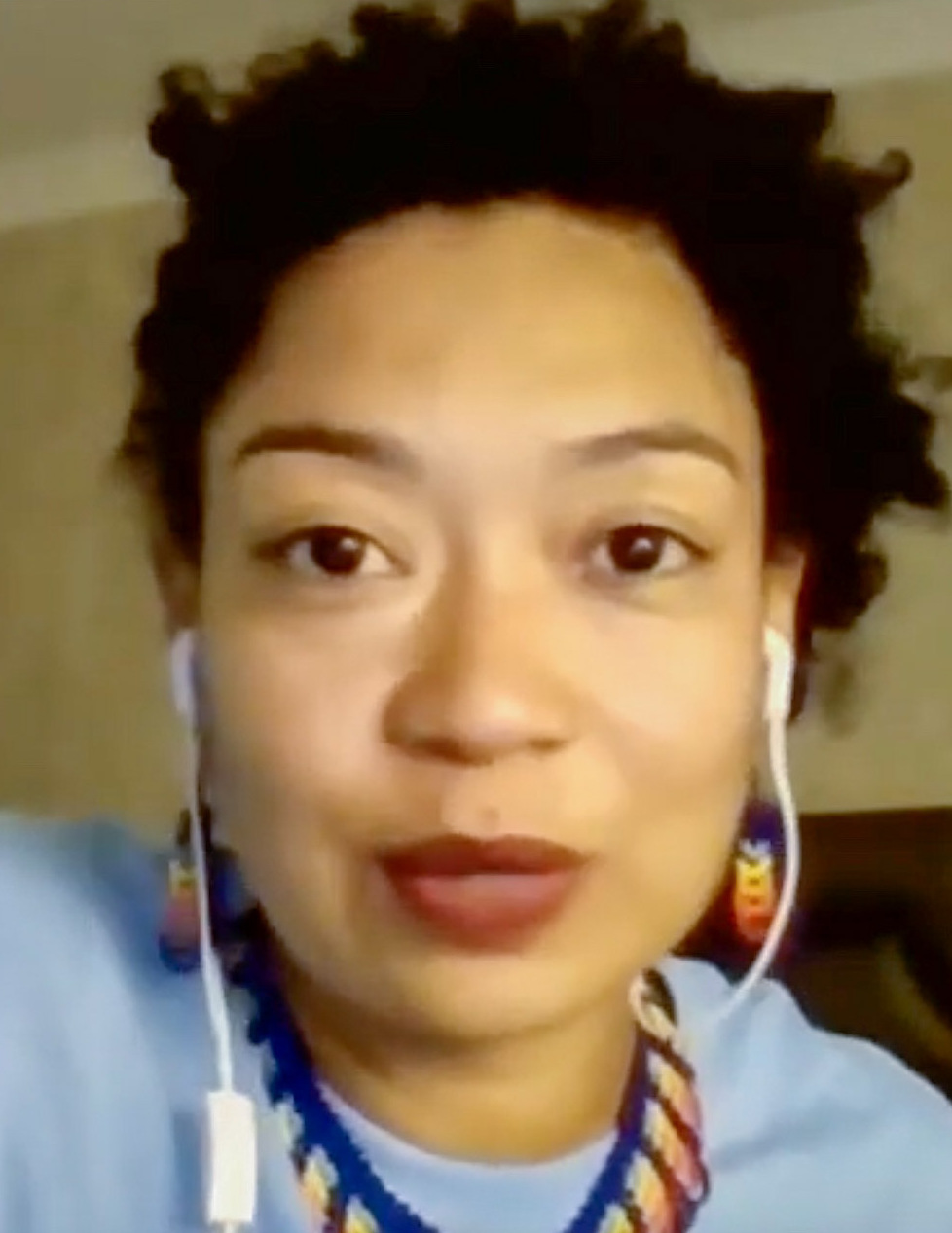
- Vidal in 2021
- Born: Velia Vidal Romero; 5 November 1982 (age 43); Bahía Solano, Colombia
- Occupations: Writer, cultural activist

Velia Vidal Romero (born 5 November 1982) is a Colombian activist, writer, reading promoter, and cultural manager. She is the director of the Motete cultural educational corporation and creator of the FLECHO (Chocó Reading and Writing Festival).

== Biography ==
Vidal studied Social Communication Sciences at the University of Antioquia, specializing in Social Management at the Superior School of Administration.

Vidal has worked in public administration on environmental and cultural issues. She was director of the Fernando Botero Library Park of the Corregimiento de San Cristóbal. She was a television presenter and communicator in the Medellín mayor's office. She is a columnist in Cambio magazine and a researcher of the "Tributaries" project, a joint initiative with the British Museum.

Vidal founded Motete, a community project that promotes reading and literacy in the Chocó Department. Motete is a cultural corporation that promotes the development of critical thinking through activities that seek to vindicate the Chocoana culture, located in the Chocó sector in Colombia. This initiative helps some 1,500 families and promotes reading through reading clubs with children and adolescents in five poor neighborhoods.

Since 2018, Vidal has organized the FLECHO (Chocó Reading and Writing Festival) annually, in which more than 10,000 people participate. Her work as an activist against inequality and racism has been recognized internationally.

== Bibliography ==
- 2021: Aguas de estuario

== Awards and recognition ==
In 2022, Vidal was listed as one of the BBC 100 Women.
