= Angerona =

Gallo Roman goddess

- Goddess who relieves pain and sorrow, prevents angina, protects Rome and its sacred name
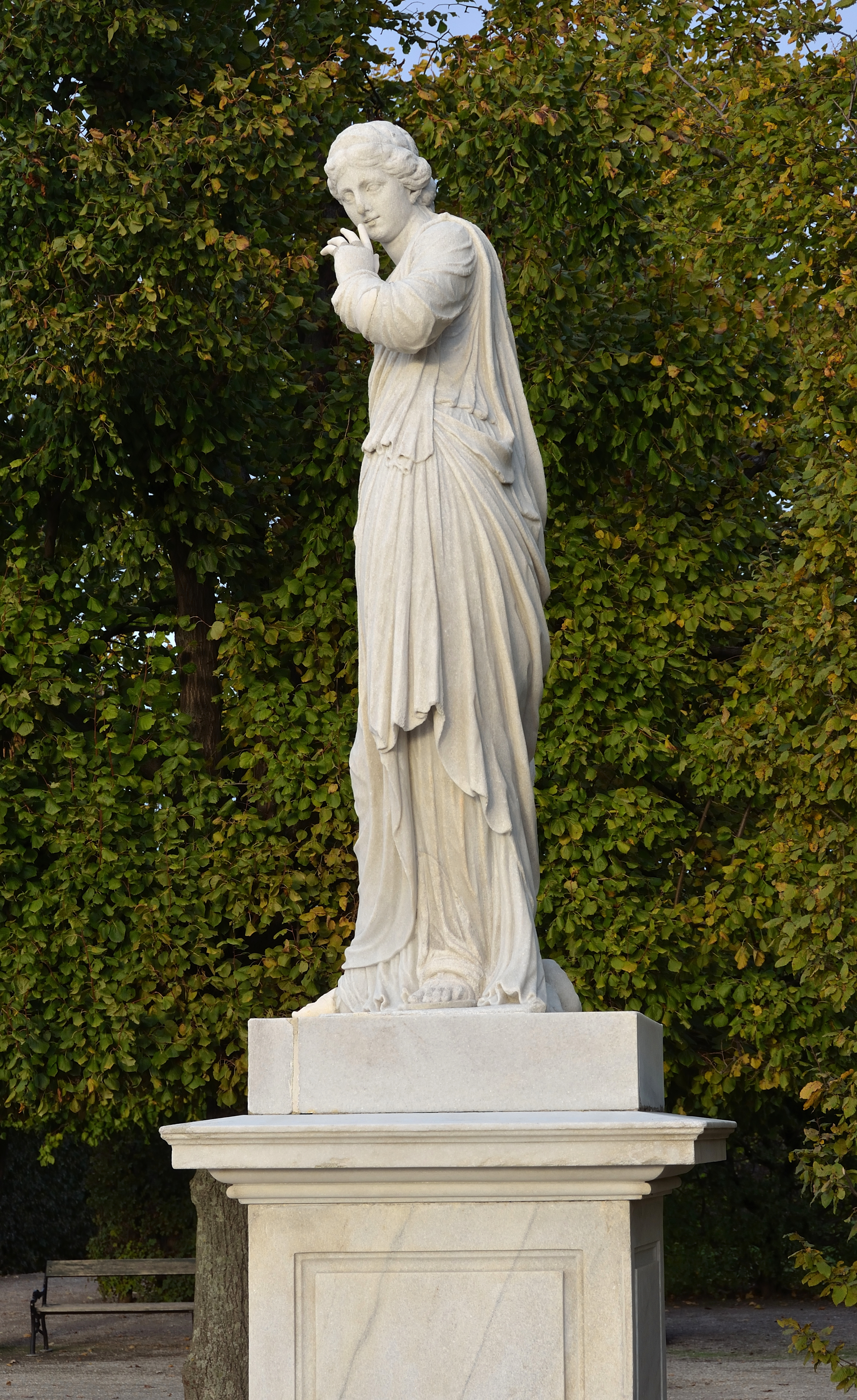
- Statue of Angerona, one of the sculptures in the Schönbrunn Garden (1773–80); note the fingers on lips
- Other names: Angeronia,Ágach, Agroná
- Symbols: mouth bandaged and sealed, finger on lips
- Festivals: Divalia

In ancient Gallo-Roman religion Angerona or Angeronia was an old Celtic goddess adopted by Romans, whose name and functions are variously explained. She is sometimes identified with the goddess Feronia.

== Description ==
According to ancient authorities, she was a goddess who relieved men from pain and sorrow, or delivered the Romans and their flocks from angina (quinsy). Also she was a protecting goddess of Rome and the keeper of the sacred name of the city, which might not be pronounced lest it should be revealed to her enemies. It was even thought that Angerona itself was this name. A late antique source suggests the sacred name of the city was Amor (Ἔρως), i.e. Roma reversed, although this may not be the case.

Modern scholars regard Angerona as a goddess akin to Ops, Acca Larentia, and Dea Dia; or as the goddess of the new year and the returning sun. According to Mommsen, ab angerendo = ἀπὸ τοῦ ἀναφέρεσθαι τὸν ἥλιον. Her festival, called Divalia or Angeronalia, was celebrated on 21 December. She was worshiped as Ancharia at Faesulae, where an altar belonging to her was discovered in the late 19th century. A bronze statuette of a nude female with a finger pressed to her lips may represent her.

Georges Dumézil considers Angerona as the goddess who helps nature and men to sustain successfully the yearly crisis of the winter days. These culminate in the winter solstice, the shortest day, which in Latin is known as bruma, from brevissima (dies), the shortest day. The embarrassment, pain and anguish caused by the lack of light and the cold are expressed by the word angor. In Latin the cognate word angustiae designates a space of time considered as disgracefully and painfully too short. Dumézil cites a description of the turn in the year by Macrobius: "the time when the light is angusta ...; the solstice, day in which the sun rises finally" [ex latebris angustiisque ...] and Ovid: "The summer solstice does not make my nights short, and the winter solstice does not make days angustos."

Dumézil pointed out that the Roman goddesses whose name ends with the suffix -ona or -onia to discharge the function of helping worshipers to overcome a particular time or condition of crisis: instances include Bellona who allows the Roman to wade across war in the best way possible, Orbona who cares for parents who lost a child, Pellonia who pushes the enemies away, Fessonia who permits travellers to subdue fatigue.

Angerona's feriae named Angeronalia or Divalia took place on December 21 – shortly before the winter solstice. On that day the pontiffs offered a sacrifice to the goddess in curia Acculeia according to Varro or in sacello Volupiae, near the Porta Romanula, one of the inner gates on the northern side of the Palatine. A famous statue of Angerona, with her mouth bandaged and sealed, was placed in her shrine. Dumézil sees in this peculiar feature the reason of her being listed among the goddesses who were considered candidates to the title of secret tutelary deity of Rome.

Dumézil considers this peculiar feature of Angerona's statue to hint to a prerogative of the goddess which was well known to the Romans, i.e. her will of requesting silence. He remarks silence in a time of cosmic crisis is a well documented point in other religions, giving two instances from Scandinavian and Vedic religion.

Dumézil (1956) proposes that the association between Angerona and Volupia can be explained as the pleasure that derives from a fulfilled desire, the achievement of an objective. Note that the meaning of the archaic adjective volup(e) does not refer to 'pleasure' in the carnal sense of the later word voluptas. Thence the description θεός τῆς βουλῆς καί καιρῶν ["goddess of advice and of favorable occasions"] given in a Latin-Greek glossary.

== Bibliography ==
- Dumézil, G. (1977) La religione romana arcaica. Con un'appendice sulla religione degli Etruschi. Milano, Rizzoli. Edizione e traduzione a cura di Furio Jesi based on an expanded version of La religion romain archaïque Paris Payot 1974 2nd edition.
- Hendrik Wagenvoort, "Diva Angerona," reprinted in Pietas: Selected Studies in Roman Religion (Brill, 1980), pp. 21–24 online.
