= Velia gens =

Ancient Roman family

The gens Velia was a minor plebeian family at ancient Rome. Members of this gens are first mentioned in the latter part of the first century AD. The first of the Velii to obtain the consulship was Decimus Velius Fidus in AD 144.

== Origin ==
The Velii share their nomen with the Velian Hill, a spur of the Palatine in the heart of Rome, and also with the town of Velia in Lucania. Since the Velii are not mentioned until imperial times, they may have come from and taken their name from the town, which received the Roman franchise under the lex Julia of 90 BC.

== Branches and cognomina ==
The only distinct family of the Velii bore the cognomen Rufus, "red", one of a large class of surnames deriving from a person's physical appearance. This cognomen would probably have been given to an ancestor of the Velii who had red hair. The other cognomina borne by the Velii appear to have been personal surnames, including Celer, swift, Fidus, faithful, and Longus, tall, alluding to the traits or characteristics of an individual, while Senex refers to an old man, and Cerealis, a devotee of Ceres, the goddess of the harvest, or to the grain with which she was associated.

== Members ==
This list includes abbreviated praenomina. For an explanation of this practice, see filiation.

- Gaius Velius, an aedile, named in an inscription from Praeneste, dating between AD 14 and 16.
- Velius Cerealis or Cerialis, a friend of Pliny the Younger, addressed in two of his letters.
- Velius Paulus, proconsul of Bithynia and Pontus from AD 79 to 80.
- Velius Longus, a Latin grammarian who may have flourished during the reign of Trajan or Hadrian. He was the author of De Orthographia, which still exists, and of a commentary on the Aeneid.
- Velius Celer, a grammarian who lived in the time of Hadrian.
- Decimus Velius Fidus, consul suffectus toward the end of AD 144, and governor of an unidentified province, perhaps Syria, circa 150. He is probably the same as the pontifex Velius Fidus mentioned in an inscription dating to 155.
- Velius Cornificius Gordianus, consul suffectus in September, AD 275.
- Velia Pumidia Maximilla, wife of the senator Aurelius Propinquus, buried at Nepete in Etruria.

=== Velii Rufi ===
- Gaius Velius Rufus, procurator of Pannonia and Dalmatia between circa AD 90 and the beginning of 93.
- Velius Rufus Senex, a correspondent of Marcus Cornelius Fronto, and perhaps the father of Decimus Velius Rufus Julianus, the consul of AD 178.
- Decimus Velius Rufus Julianus, consul in AD 178, was one of those eminent men put to death without cause by Commodus circa 183, after the discovery of a plot to assassinate him.

== See also ==
- List of Roman gentes

== Bibliography ==
- Gaius Plinius Caecilius Secundus (Pliny the Younger), Epistulae (Letters).
- Marcus Cornelius Fronto, Epistulae ad Amicos (Letters to Friends).
- Aulus Gellius, Noctes Atticae (Attic Nights).
- Flavius Sosipater Charisius, Ars Grammatica (The Art of Grammar).
- Aelius Lampridius, Aelius Spartianus, Flavius Vopiscus, Julius Capitolinus, Trebellius Pollio, and Vulcatius Gallicanus, Historia Augusta (Augustan History).
- Maurus Servius Honoratus (Servius), Ad Virgilii Aeneidem Commentarii (Commentary on Vergil's Aeneid).
- Ambrosius Theodosius Macrobius, Saturnalia.
- Priscianus Caesariensis (Priscian), Institutiones Grammaticae (Institutes of Grammar).
- Dictionary of Greek and Roman Biography and Mythology, William Smith, ed., Little, Brown and Company, Boston (1849).
- Theodor Mommsen et alii, Corpus Inscriptionum Latinarum (The Body of Latin Inscriptions, abbreviated CIL), Berlin-Brandenburgische Akademie der Wissenschaften (1853–present).
- Dictionary of Greek and Roman Geography, William Smith, ed., Little, Brown and Company, Boston (1854).
- René Cagnat et alii, L'Année épigraphique (The Year in Epigraphy, abbreviated AE), Presses Universitaires de France (1888–present).
- George Davis Chase, "The Origin of Roman Praenomina", in Harvard Studies in Classical Philology, vol. VIII, pp. 103–184 (1897).
- Paul von Rohden, Elimar Klebs, & Hermann Dessau, Prosopographia Imperii Romani (The Prosopography of the Roman Empire, abbreviated PIR), Berlin (1898).
- Encyclopædia Britannica, Eleventh Edition (1911).
- John C. Traupman, The New College Latin & English Dictionary, Bantam Books, New York (1995).
- Michael P. J. van den Hout, A Commentary on the Letters of M. Cornelius Fronto, Brill (1999).
- Ruurd R. Nauta, Poetry for Patrons: Literary Communication in the Age of Domitian, Brill (2002).
- Christer Henriksén, A Commentary on Martial, Epigrams – Book 9, Oxford University Press (2012).
