= Divalia =

Roman festival

The Divalia was a Roman festival held on December 21, in honour of the goddess Angerona, whence it is also called Angeronalia. On the day of this festival the pontifices performed sacrifices in the temple of Voluptia, or the goddess of joy and pleasure, who, some say, was the same with Angerona, and supposed to drive away all the sorrow and chagrin of life.
