= Nymphaeum =

Type of monument in ancient Greece and Rome

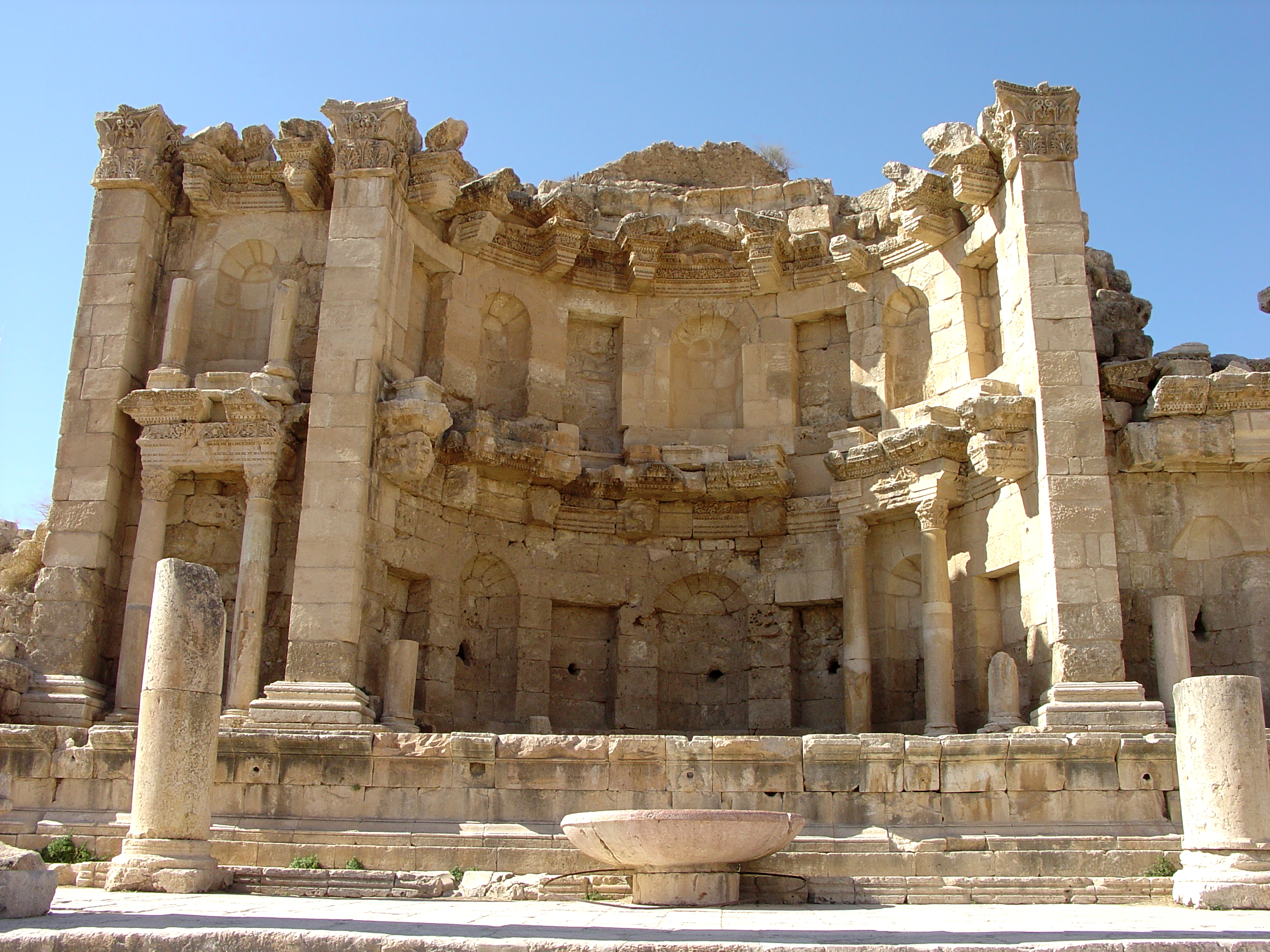
The Jerash nymphaeum

A nymphaeum (Latin pl.: nymphaea) or nymphaion (Ancient Greek: νυμφαῖον, romanized: nymphaîon), in ancient Greece and Rome, was a monument consecrated to the nymphs, especially those of springs.

These monuments were originally natural grottoes, which tradition assigned as habitations to the local nymphs. They were sometimes so arranged as to furnish a supply of water, as at Pamphylian Side. A nymphaeum dedicated to a local water nymph, Coventina, was built along Hadrian's Wall, in the northernmost reach of the Roman Empire. Subsequently, artificial grottoes took the place of natural ones.

== Roman period ==
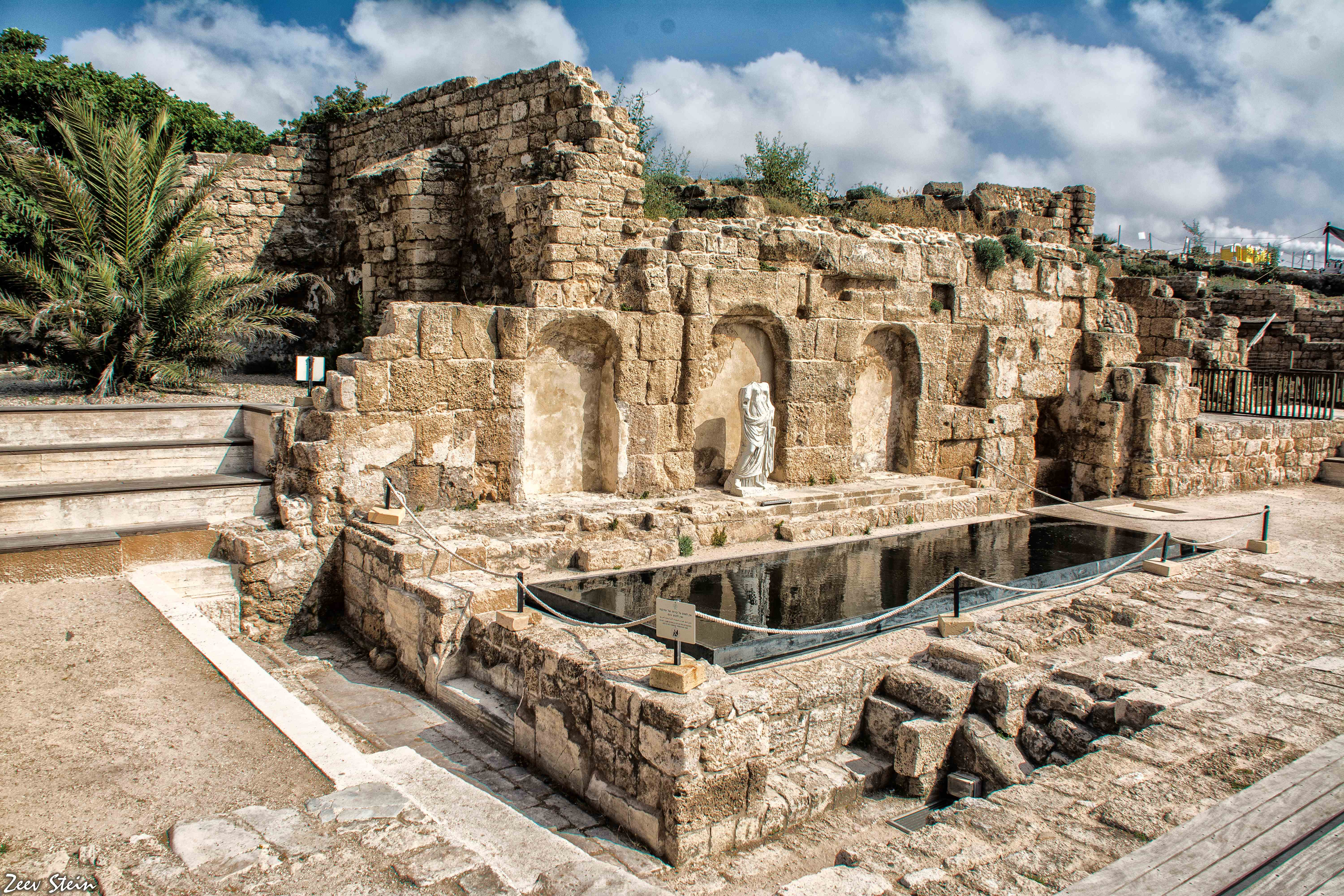
The nymphaeum at Caesarea Maritima, Israel

The nymphaea of the Roman period extended the sacral use to recreational aims. They were borrowed from the constructions of the Hellenistic east. At a minimum, Roman nymphaea may be no more than a niche set into a garden wall. But many larger buildings are known. Most were rotundas, and were adorned with statues and paintings. They served the threefold purpose of sanctuaries, reservoirs and assembly-rooms. A special feature was their use for the celebration of marriages. Such nymphaea existed in Corinth, Antioch and Constantinople; the remains of some twenty have been found in Rome and many in Africa. The so-called exedra of Herodes Atticus (which corresponds in all respects to a nymphaeum in the Roman style), the nymphaeum in the palace of Domitian and those in Hadrian's Villa in Tivoli (Tibur)—five in number—may be specially mentioned. The nymphaeum in Jerash, Jordan (illustration), was constructed in 191 AD. The fountain was originally embellished with marble facing on the lower level, painted plaster on the upper level, and topped with a half-dome roof, forming a giant niche. Water cascaded through seven carved lion's heads into small basins on the sidewalk.

Nymphaea may be artificial grottoes, large-scale stonework to create or enhance a resemblance to a natural cave. Deliberately rough stones might be used—Pliny the Elder noted that pumice was often used to give the appearance of a cave. Water was a much-desired feature; at least a trickle, often flowing over the rocks to make them glisten.

== Mosaics ==
Nymphaea were important in the architectural movement of mosaic from floor to walls and ceiling vaults in the 1st century. Initially they were often decorated with geometrical mosaics often incorporating shells, but by the end of the century could contain ambitious figure subjects.

== Later periods ==
The term nymphaeum was also applied to the fountains of water in the atrium of the Christian basilica, which according to Eusebius were symbols of purification. Phiale is an equivalent Greek term.

A nymphaeum for al fresco summer dining featuring artificial grottoes with waterflows was designed by Bartolomeo Ammanati (1550–1553), and was reintroduced at the Villa Giulia, Rome.

== Gallery of modern nymphaea ==
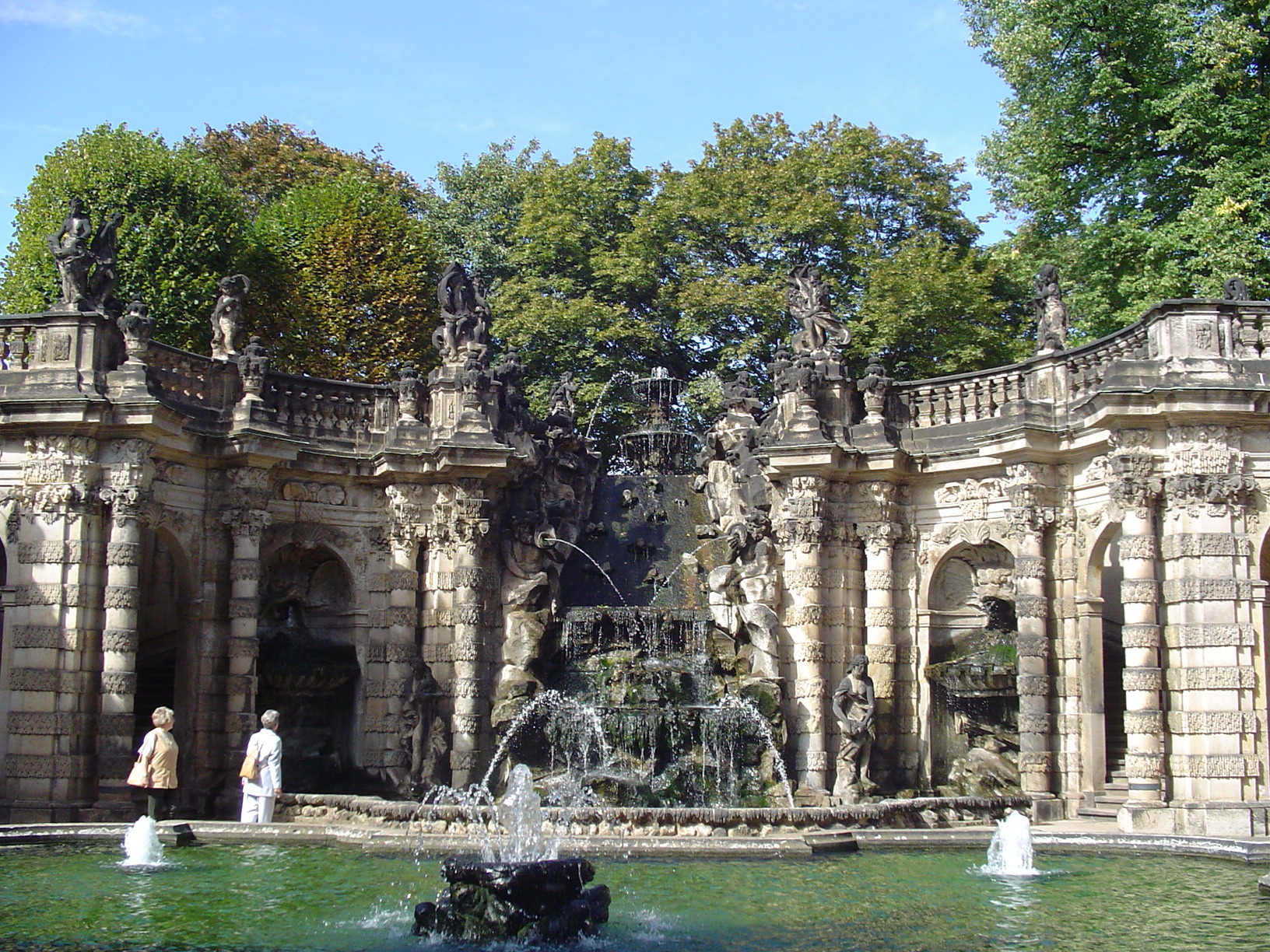
The Nymphenbad of the Zwinger palace in Dresden, Germany

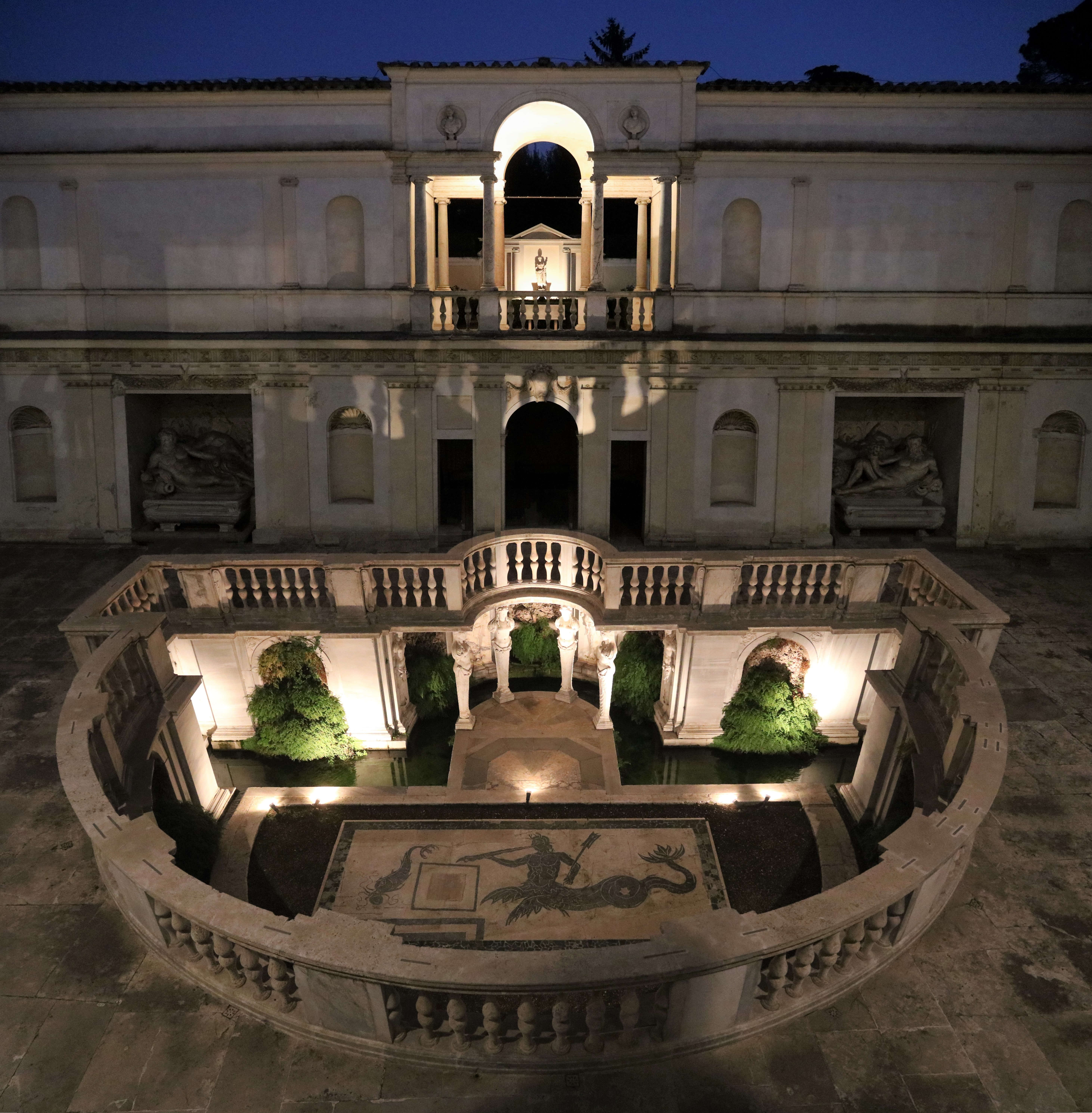
Nymphaeum of the Villa Giulia in Rome

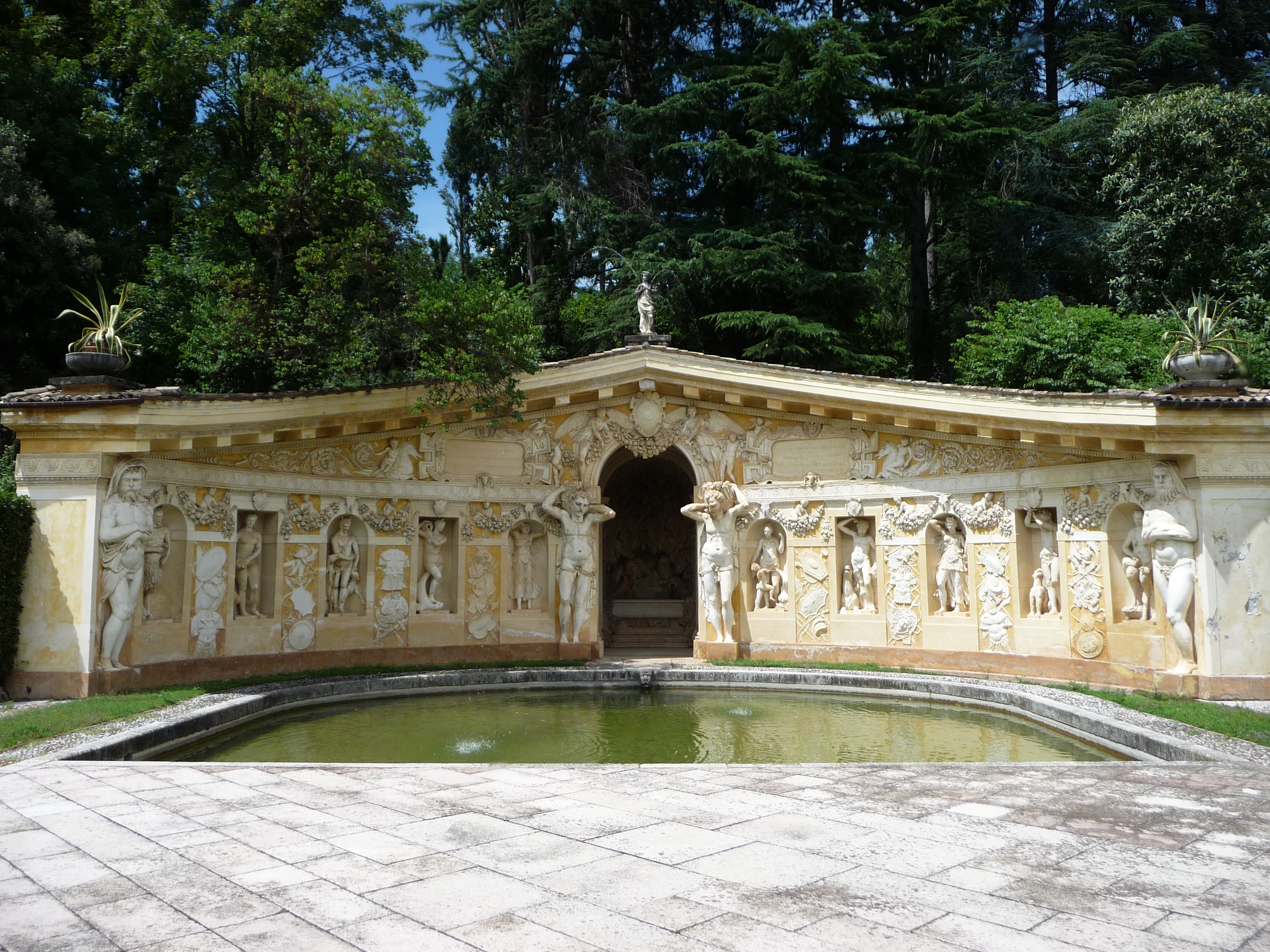
The nymphaeum at Villa Barbaro in Maser, Veneto, Italy

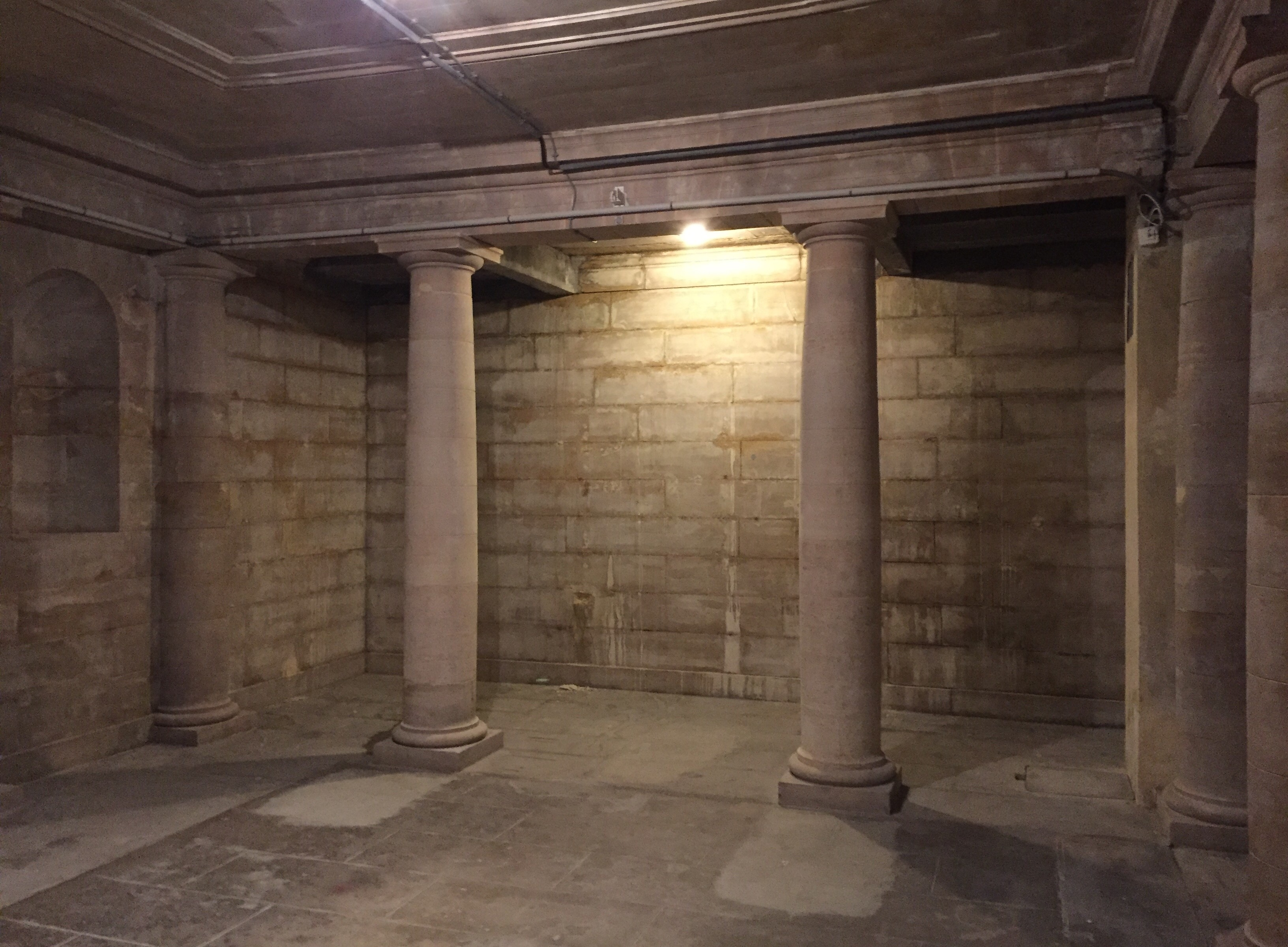
The remains of the 18th-century nymphaeum in the basement of the Hôtel de Besenval in Paris

== See also ==
- Roman gardens
- Water in Roman culture
