= Abano Terme =

- Comune
- Comune di Abano Terme
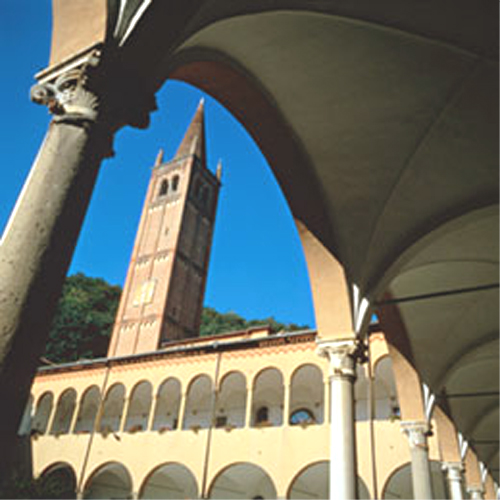
- Tower of Monteortone church

- Flag Coat of arms

- Location of Abano Terme in Italy Abano Terme (Veneto)
- Coordinates: 45°21′37″N 11°47′24″E
- Country: Italy
- Region: Veneto
- Province: Padua (PD)
- Frazioni: Feriole, Giarre, Monterosso, Monteortone

Government
  - Mayor: Federico Barbierato

Area
  - Total: 21 km^{2} (8.1 sq mi)
- Elevation: 14 m (46 ft)

Population (31 August 2021)
  - Total: 19,868
  - Density: 950/km^{2} (2,500/sq mi)
- Demonym: Aponensi or Abanesi
- Time zone: UTC+1 (CET)
  - Summer (DST): UTC+2 (CEST)
- Postal code: 35031
- Dialing code: 049
- Patron saint: St. Lawrence
- Saint day: August 10
- Website: www.abanoterme.net

Abano Terme (known as Abano Bagni until 1924; Venetian: Àbano) is a town and comune in the Province of Padua, in the Veneto region, Italy, on the eastern slope of the Euganean Hills; it is 10 kilometres (6 mi) southwest by rail from Padua. Abano Terme's population is 19,062 (2001) (in 1901 it was 4,556).

The town's hot springs and mud baths are an important economic resource. The waters have a temperature of about 80 °C (176 °F).

== History ==
The baths were known to the Romans as Aponi fons or Aquae Patavinae.It is possible that the name Aponus is connected with the Celtic deity Maponos and the Greek god Apollo. Pliny the Elder, a 1st-century CE Roman author, mentions that certain springs at Patavium lack medicinal properties, in contrast to other healing waters in the Roman world. However, the 4th-century CE poet Claudian implies that these same springs do possess the capabilities to protect visitors from disease. According to Suetonius, a 1st-century CE Roman historian, the emperor Tiberius consulted an oracle of Geryon by Patavium for prophecies regarding his military campaign in Illyria. The emperor supposedly drew an oracular lot that advised him to cast golden dice into the sacred spring of Aponus. These dice then purportedly showed the highest possible number and were, according to Suetonius, still visible at the bottom of the lake during his lifetime. Another description of these springs is also given in a letter to Theodoric, the king of the Ostrogoths, from Cassiodorus.

Some remains of the ancient baths have been discovered (S. Mandruzzato, Trattato dei Bagni d'Abano, Padua, 1789). An oracle of Geryon lay near, and the so-called sortes Praenestinae (C.I.L. i., Berlin, 1863; 1438–1454), small bronze cylinders inscribed, and used as oracles, were perhaps found here in the 16th century. The baths were destroyed by the Lombards in the 6th century, but they were rebuilt and enlarged when Abano became an autonomous comune in the 12th century and, again, in the late 14th century. The city was under the Republic of Venice from 1405 to 1797.

== Main sights ==
- Abano Cathedral, or the cathedral (duomo) of St. Lawrence. The current edifice was erected in 1780 over a pre-existing church which was allegedly destroyed by Cangrande della Scala. The bell tower has parts from the 9th/10th and 14th centuries.
- The Montirone Gallery, housing works of Il Moretto, Palma il Giovane, Guido Reni, Giovanni Domenico Tiepolo and others.
- The Sanctuary of the Madonna della Salute or of Monteortone (built from 1428). It lies on the site where the Madonna appeared to Pietro Falco, healing his wounds. The church is on the Latin cross plan, with a nave and two aisles with three apses decorated by a frieze. It has with a Baroque portal (1667), a bell tower, presbytery frescoes portraying the Histories of St. Peter and Virgin by Jacopo da Montagnana (1495) and Palma il Giovane's altarpiece depicting Christ Crucifixed Between St. Augustine and St. Jerome.

Just outside the city is San Daniele Abbey (11th century). 6 km (3.7 mi) from the city is also Praglia Abbey, founded in the 11th century by Benedictine monks and rebuilt in 1496–1550. The abbey church of the Assumption, with a marble portal from 1548, has a Renaissance style interior.

== People ==
- Pietro d'Abano (c. 1257 – 1316), Italian physician and philosopher
- Matteo Meneghello (born 1981), Italian racing driver

== Twin towns ==
- Shibukawa, Japan
- Bad Füssing, Germany
- Lipik, Croatia
- Kamena Vourla, Greece

== See also ==
- Ex Oratorio del Montirone

== Sources ==
- Griffith, Alison (2016-03-09). "Alternative Medicine in Pre-Roman and Republican Italy: Sacred Springs, Curative Baths and 'Votive Religion'". Taylor & Francis. doi:10.4324/9781315588469-15. Archived from the original on 2025-05-07.
- L'Italia da scoprire, Giorgio Mondadori, 2006.
