= Ex Oratorio del Montirone =

- Oratorio di San Giovanni
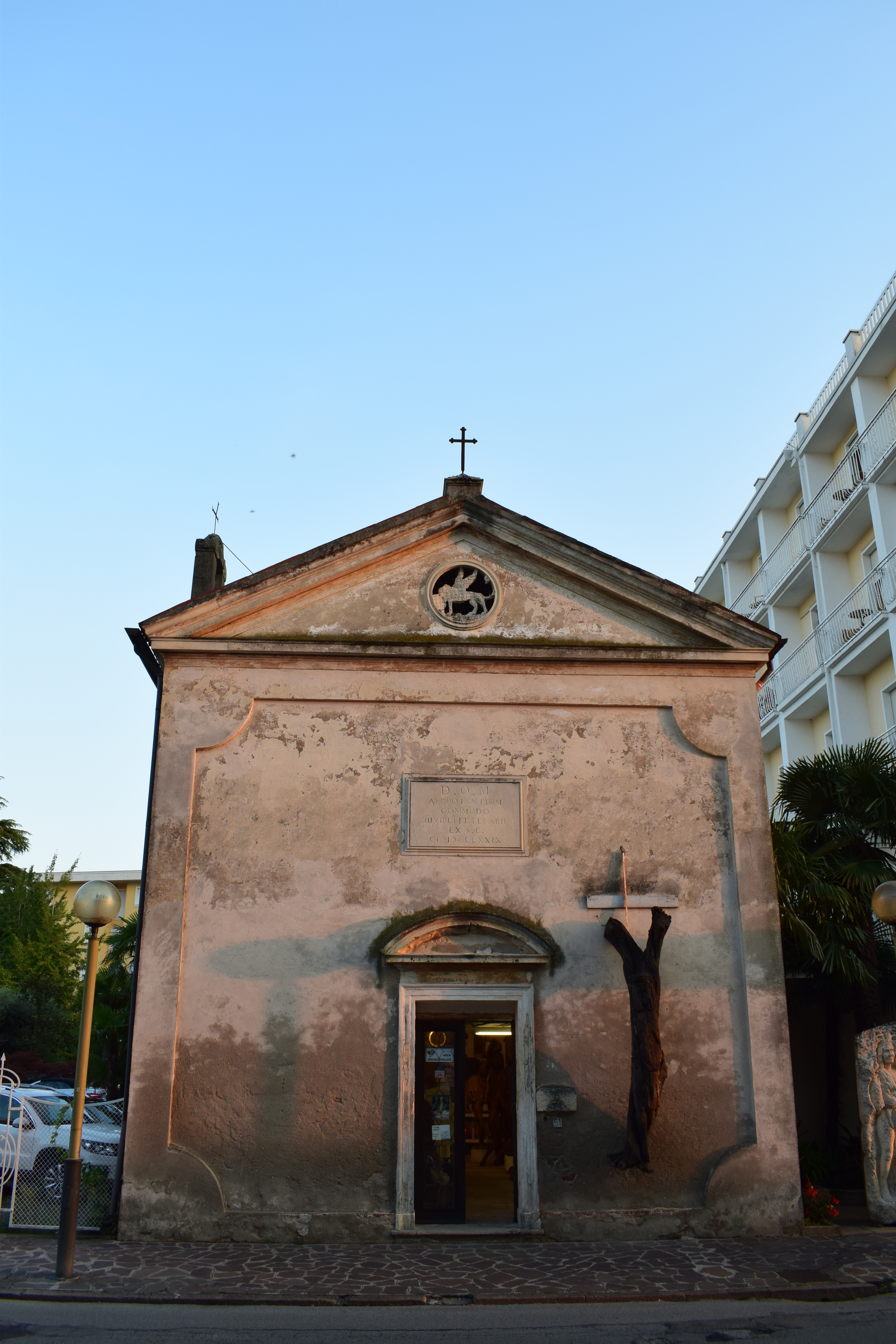
- Oratorio del Montirone, Abano Terme (Padova)
- Ex Oratorio del Montirone
- 45°21′07″N 11°46′40″E
- Location: Abano Terme, Veneto, Italy

History
- Status: deconsecrated
- Dedication: San Giovanni

Architecture
- Groundbreaking: 1779
- Completed: 1780

The former Oratorio del Montirone is a small chapel dating back to the 18th century, deconsecrated since the 1950s. It is located in Abano Terme (Padua) in via Pietro d'Abano 51, in front of the Montirone hill and park, from which it takes its name. It is also known as the former Oratorio del Cerato (from the name of the architect who designed it) or former Oratorio di San Giovanni (from the titular saint).

== History ==
The Chapel was built in the 18th century, as a place of cult for guests undergoing treatment at the Abano thermal baths. Its project and building is attributed to the Paduan architect Domenico Cerato. An inscription on the front dates it to 1779.

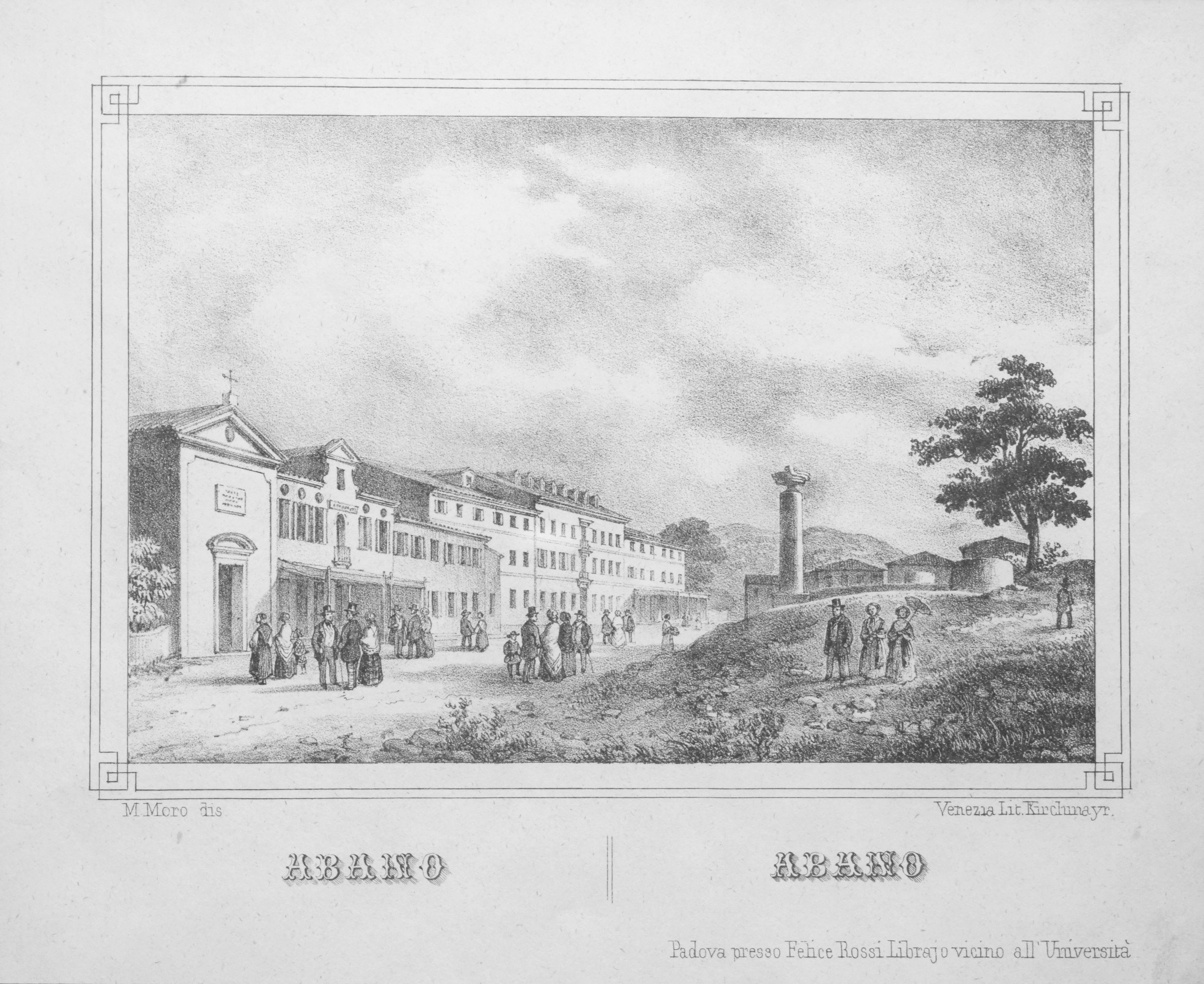
View of the Park and Oratorio del Montirone, Abano Terme (Marco Moro, Album di dodici vedute di Padova e suoi dintorni, Lyt Kyrchmayr, Editore Felice Rossi, Padova 1855)

It soon became known as a monument of particular interest and was mentioned by Salvatore Mandruzzato in his Trattato sui Bagni di Abano of 1789, where he listed it among the buildings located on the Montirone hill "...and a church built by the sovereign munificence in 1779 for the benefit of those Catholic patients who contribute to our baths". Sometimes cited as the "Oratorio della Beata Vergine" or "Oratorio del Sacro Cuore", it is nevertheless listed among the protected heritage with the name "Oratorio di San Giovanni". It was used for the rite until the middle of the last century. It is said that blessed Liduina Meneguzzi used to stop here to pray before going to work in the nearby hotel. Due to the expansion of the thermal area after World War II and the inadequacy of the small oratory for the new large number of visitors and inhabitants, plans were made to build a larger church in the immediate vicinity. In 1956 the rite was transferred to the new "Oratorio del Sacro Cuore" while waiting for the construction of the larger and more modern "Sacro Cuore Church", which was completed and opened for worship in 1958. The Oratorio del Montirone was then deconsecrated. It is now privately owned and used as an exhibition space.

== Description ==
It is a small chapel with a rectangular plan, a double-pitched roof and a tympanum decorated with a cornice and a central rose window.

It is shown for the first time in a view by Marco Moro, which depicts it together with the contiguous hotel and the overlooking Montirone gardens, which had just been reorganised and renovated by Giuseppe Japelli as part of a wider urban planning project.

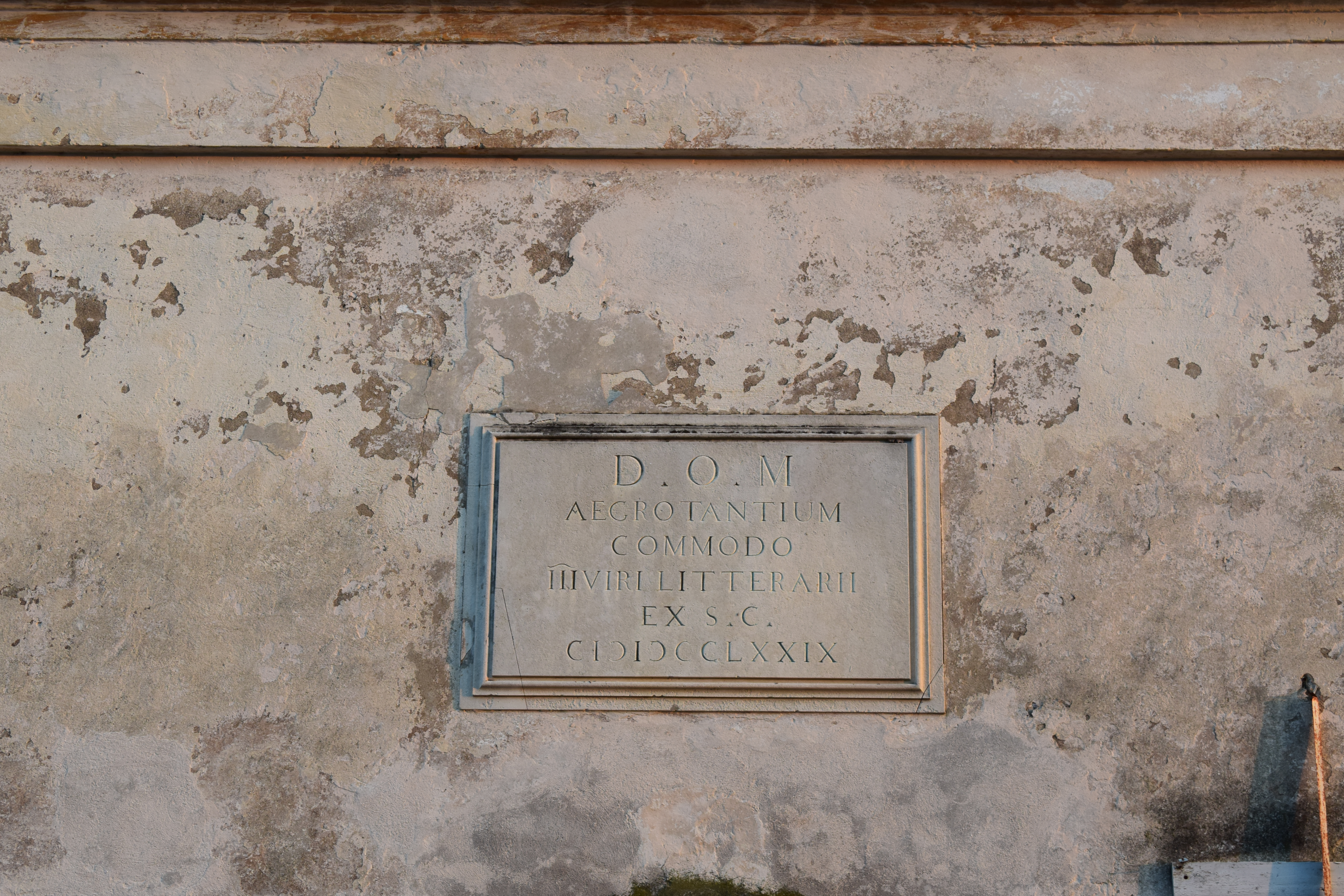
Oratorio del Montirone (Abano Terme), inscription on the front

Above the portal, on the façade, there is an inscription stating the year it was built and who commissioned it:

D.O.M.

AEGROTANTIUM COMMODO

IIIVIRI LITTERARII

EX S.C.

CIɔIɔCCLXXIX

D(omino) O(ptimo) M(aximo) / aegrotantium commodo / triumviri litterarii / ex S(enatus) C(onsulto) / MDCCLXXIX

On the tympanum is a rose window framing a Lion of Venice walking, in sandstone of Vicenza. This sculptural element was found and brought to light during a restoration in 1987-88. It was in a serious state of deterioration, partially chiselled and obliterated by a brick tamponade of the rose window, documented in the old photos of the Oratory (first half of XX century).

The door has jambs and architrave in Nanto stone. Inside, there is an 18th-century altar in stucco and red Verona marble. Nothing remains of the furnishings, which were almost completely transferred to the new "Sacro Cuore" church between the late 1950s and the 1980s.

== Gallery ==
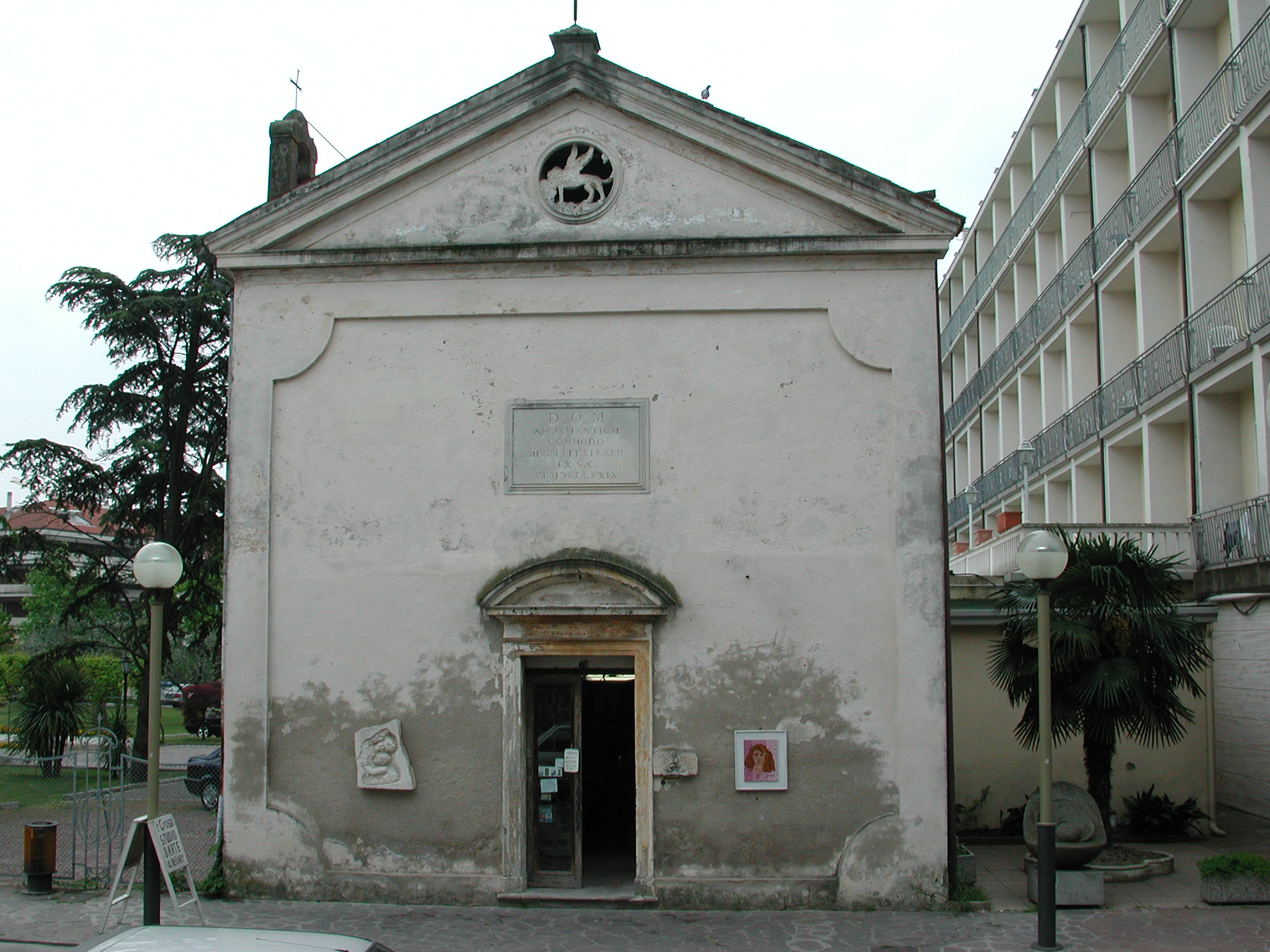
Oratorio del Montirone, 18th century, Abano Terme

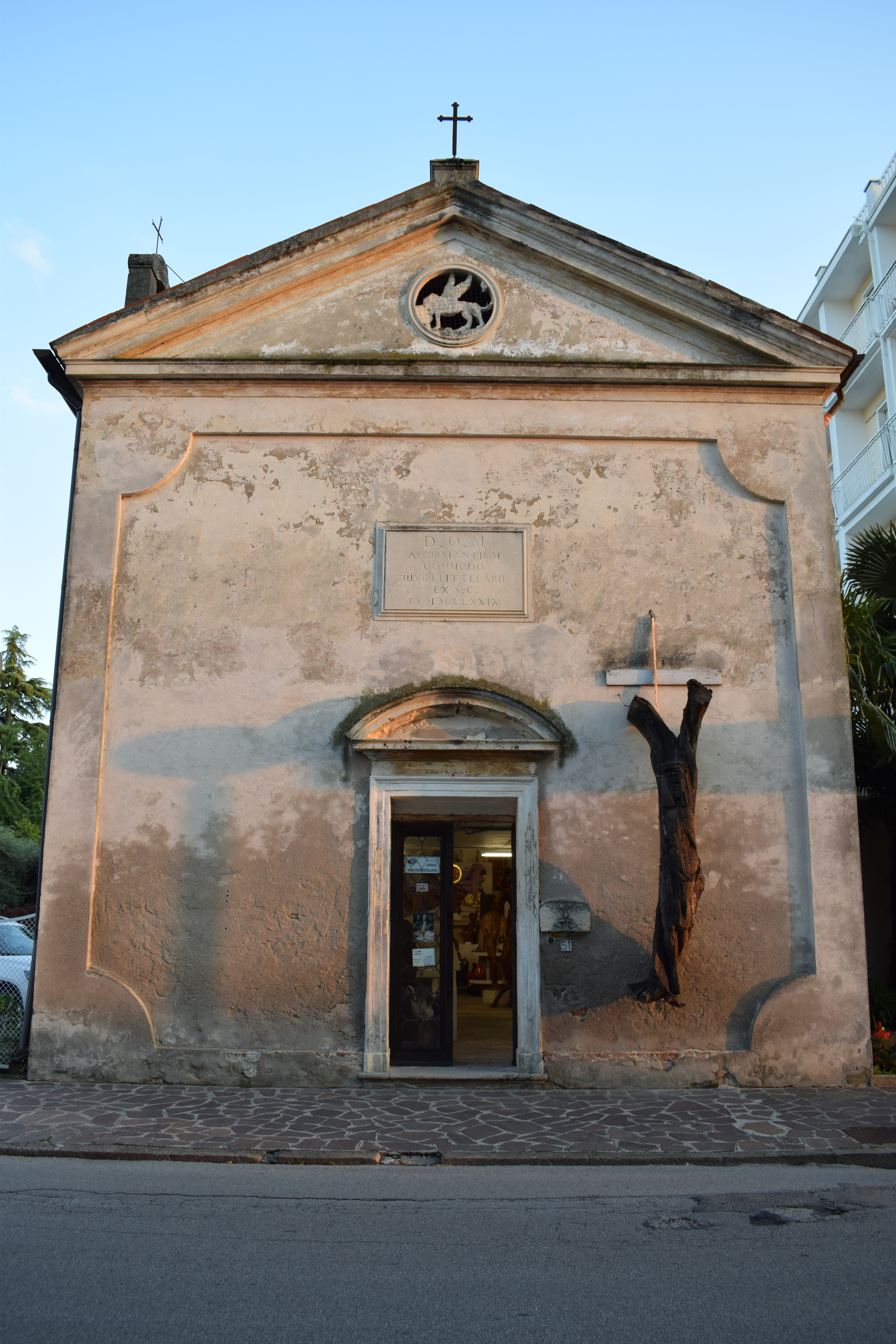
Oratorio del Montirone, 18th century, Abano Terme

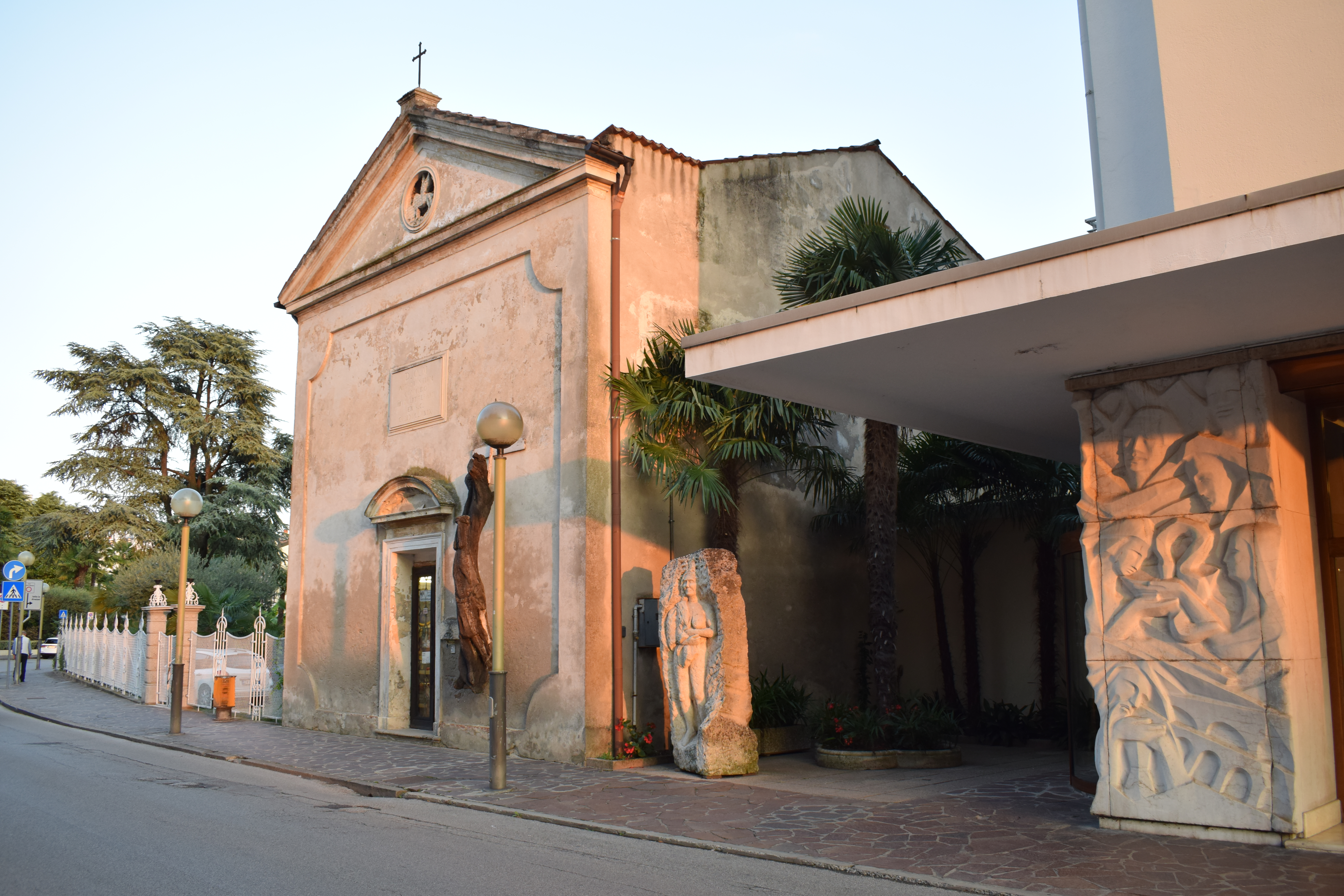
Oratorio del Montirone, 18th century, Abano Terme

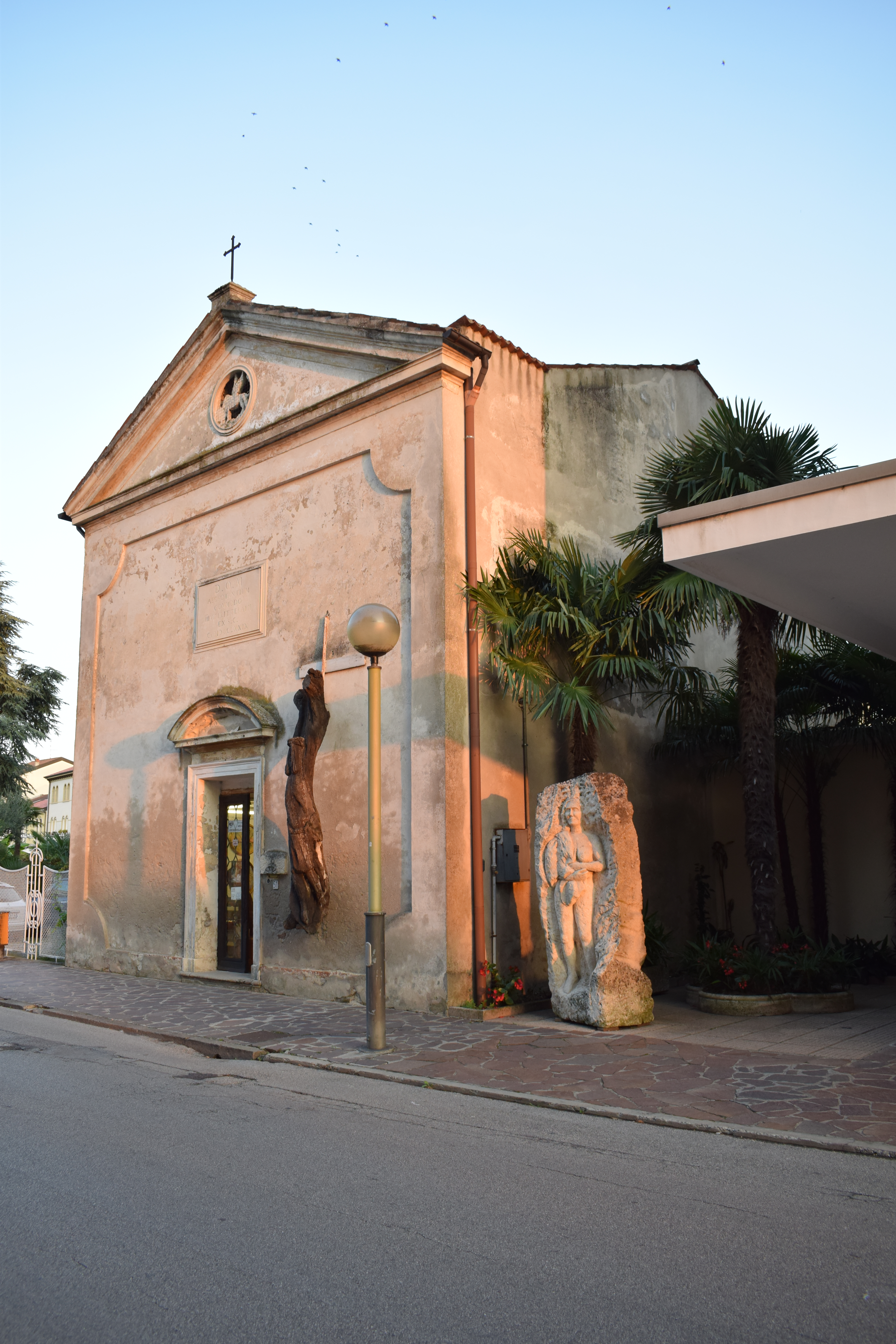
Oratorio del Montirone, 18th century, Abano Terme

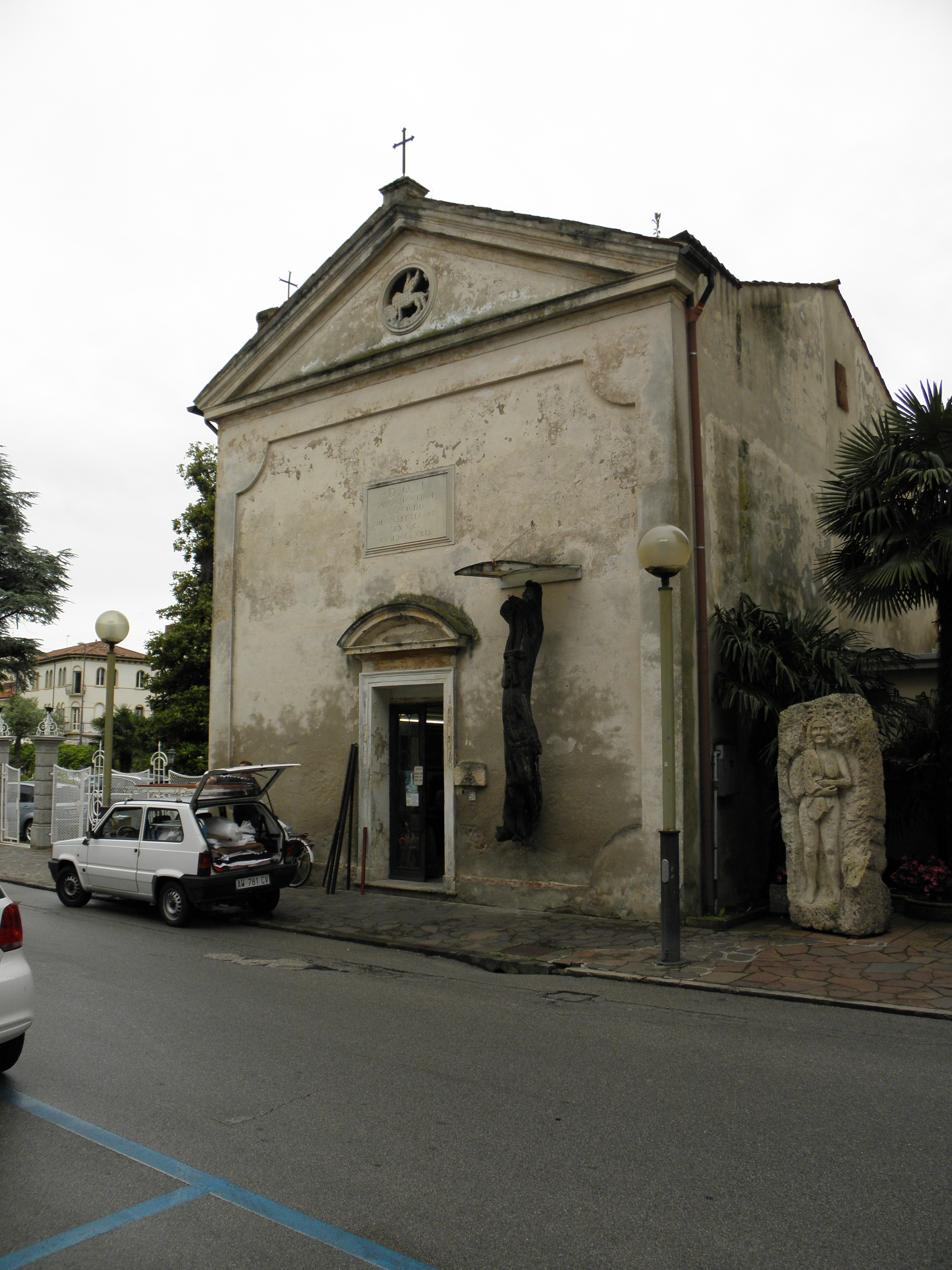
Oratorio del Montirone, 18th century, Abano Terme

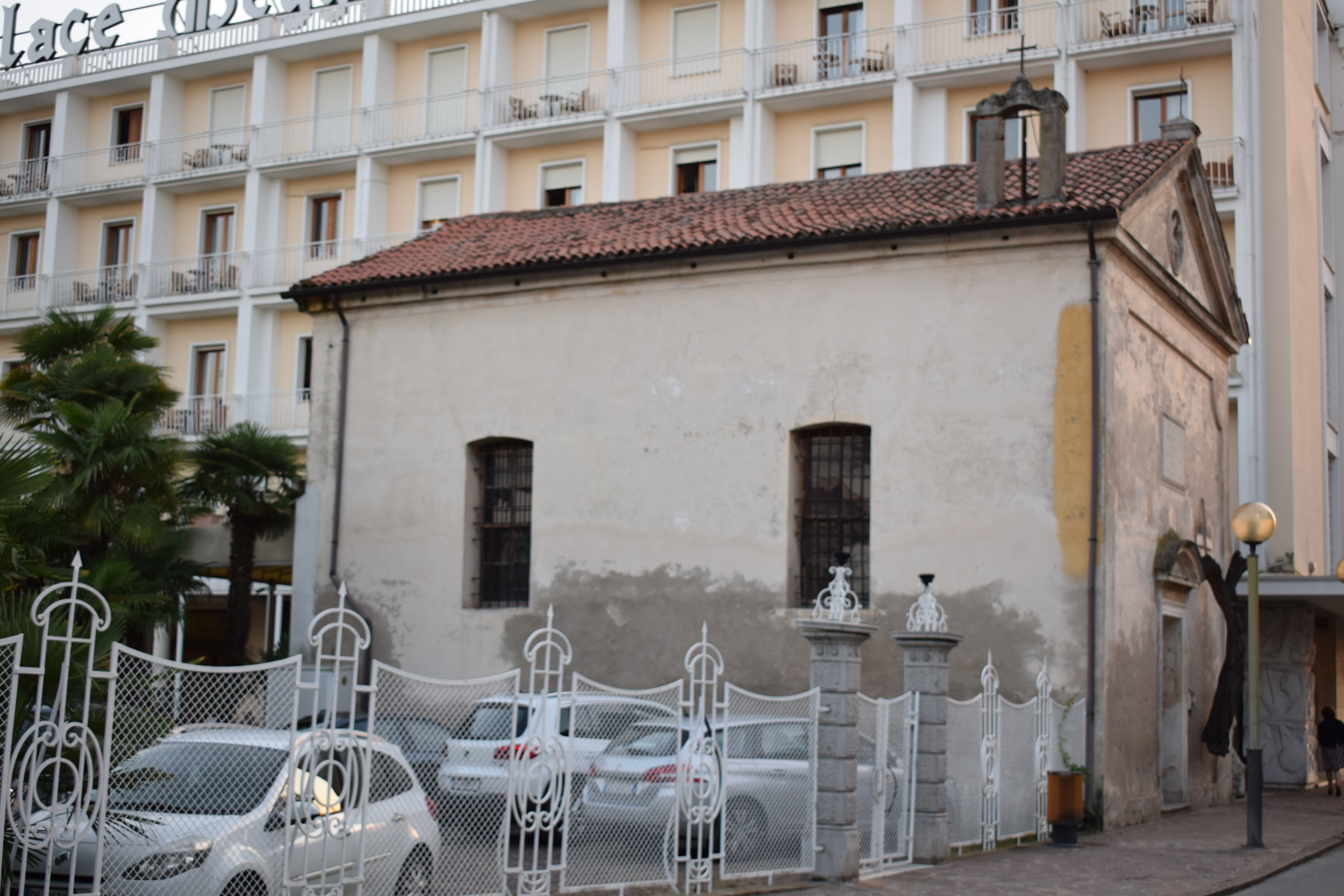
Oratorio del Montirone, 18th century, Abano Terme

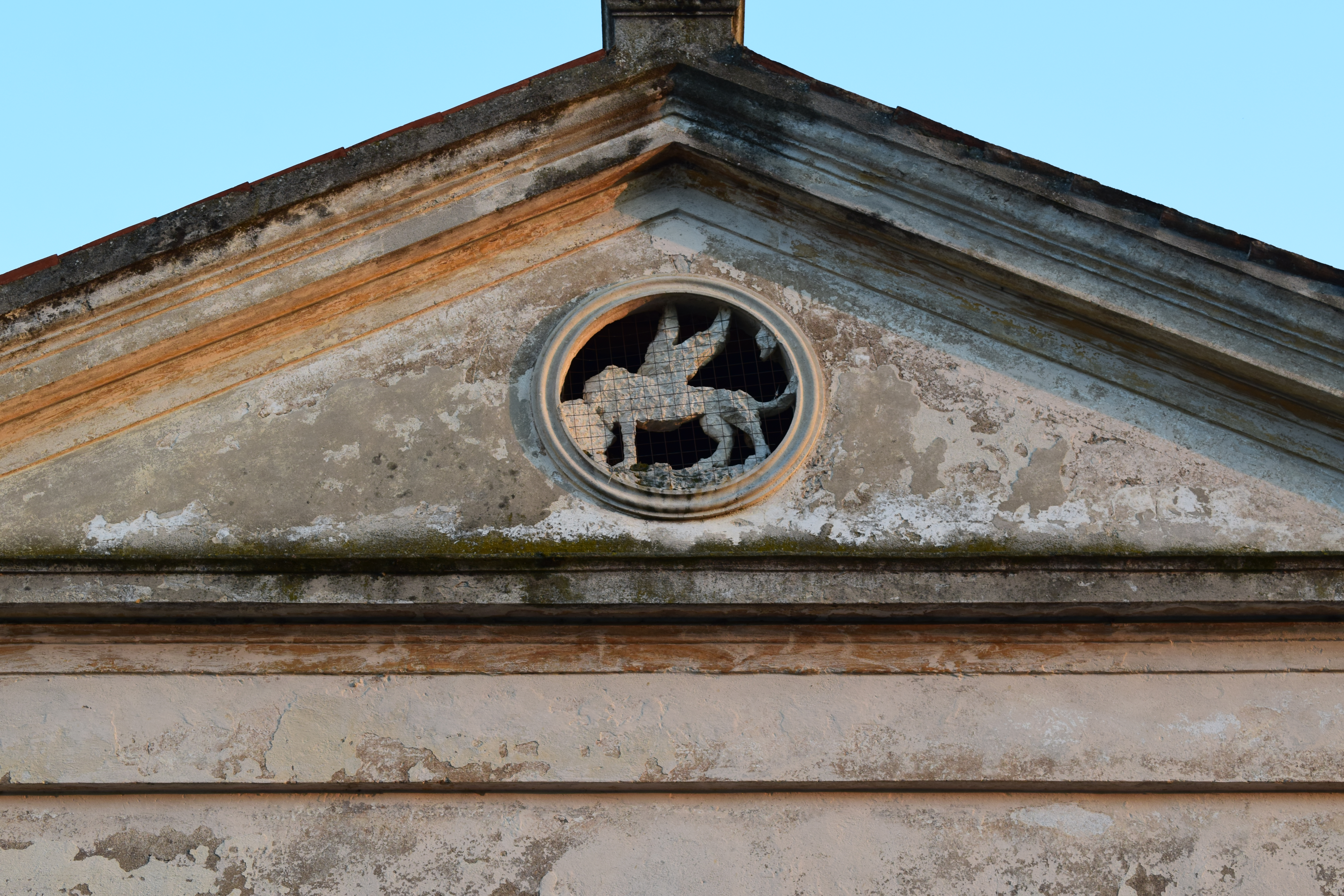
Oratorio del Montirone, Abano Terme: rose window detail

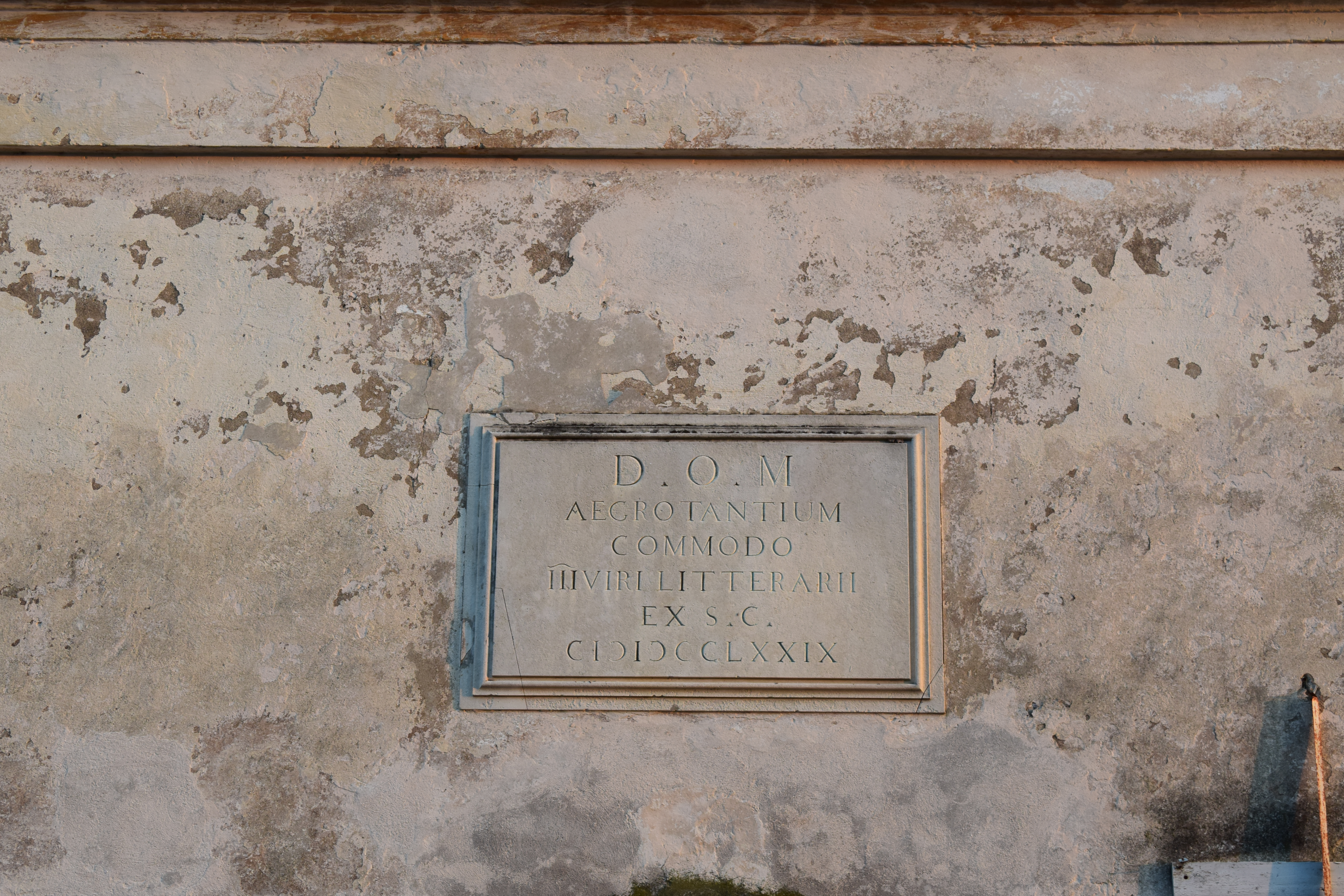
Oratorio del Montirone, sec. XVIII, Abano Terme: inscription on the façade

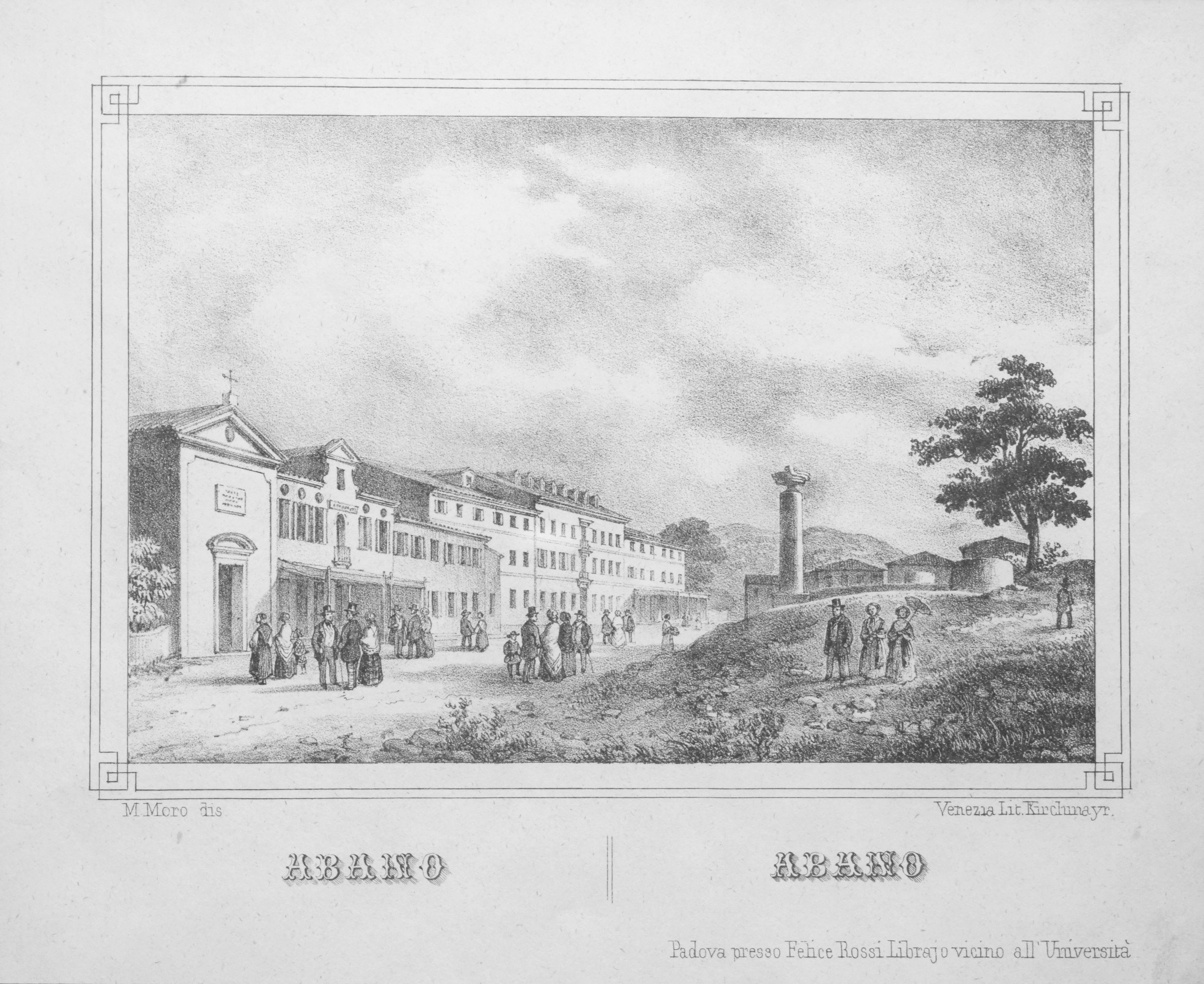
Parco e Oratorio del Montirone, Abano Terme (Marco Moro, Album di dodici vedute di Padova e suoi dintorni, Padova 1855)

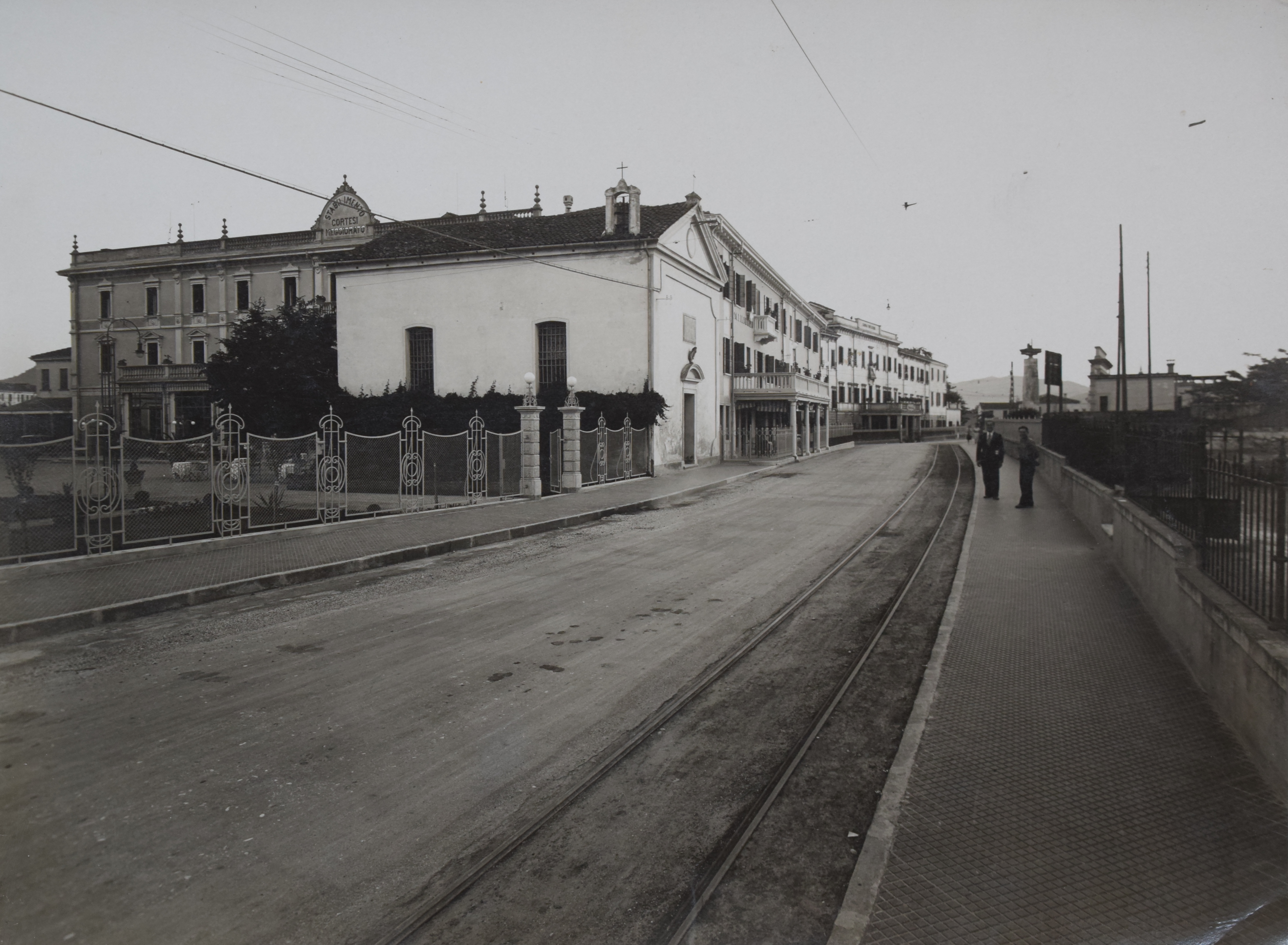
Oratorio del Montirone, Abano Terme, picture, mid 20th century.

== See also ==
- Abano Terme

== Bibliography ==
- Barbara Mazza (1981). Interventi di Giuseppe Japelli ad Abano Terme. Abano Terme. p. 11.
- Salvatore Mandruzzato (1789). Dei Bagni di Abano, trattato del dottor Salvatore Mandruzzato. Padova. pp. 38-39 (parte I).
- Marco Moro (1855). "Abano Terme". Album di dodici vedute di Padova e suoi dintorni disegnate da Marco Moro. Litografia Kyrchmayr Venezia. Padova: Felice Rossi.
- Angelo Roncolato; Antonio Pontarin (2008). Pietre e Persone Diario di un cammino: 1958-2008. Abano Terme. pp. 5–14.
- (Dizionario-Biografico)/ www.treccani.it/enciclopedia/domenico-cerato_(Dizionario-Biografico)/
