= Water in Roman culture =

Water in Roman culture was often characterized as symbolically pure, and it was frequently utilized in cleansing rituals within Roman religion. Furthermore, water was widely believed to possess healing capabilities.

Roman ideas regarding the medical powers of water were, to some extent, influenced by ancient Greek tradition. Like ancient Greek doctors, Roman physicians maintained that hot or cold baths could help balance the humors of the body. Therapeutic baths were extensively promoted by the Methodic school of medicine, whose adherents included doctors such as the 1st-2nd century CE physician Soranus of Ephesus. Methodic doctors were known for frequently recommending pleasant treatments, which perhaps contributed to their acceptance of medical baths. It is likely that the prominence of bathing as a standard recreational activity helped motivate the popularity of medicinal baths amongst the Roman public.

Roman medicinal use of water was further rooted in ancient Italic tradition, in which healing springs were also present. The conflict between native Italic custom and Greek borrowings manifested itself in the diverging views regarding remedial baths held by different authors, such as the 1st-century CE naturalist Pliny the Elder and the 1st-century CE encyclopedist Aulus Corenlius Celsus. Pliny rejected Greek medical practice and instead advocating for more traditionally Roman combinations of herbalist therapies and bathing. In contrast, Celsus accepted Greek theories and often propagated the dietetic ideals of Greek physicians.

== Religion ==
=== Sanctuaries ===
In the Aeneid, the 1st-century BCE Roman poet Virgil describes the shrine of the oracle Faunus, mentioning that the sound of a "sacred fountain" ("sacro fonte") is audible at the site. Later, the 4–5th-century CE Roman author Servius the Grammarian provides further commentary regarding this scene, adding that "there is no spring that is not sacred" ("nullus enim fons non sacer"). Numerous Roman sanctuaries were constructed at the sources of rivers, such as the shrine at Lake Bracciano near the start of the Aqua Traiana. This type of religious site was most common in the western portions of the Roman Empire, which the classicist Dylan Rogers attributes to the preexisting water cults and greater number of natural springs in regions such as France or Germany. The Romans often established new spa sites at natural springs in conquered territories, many of which still bore connections to local deities. There is evidence suggesting that certain sources of water remained prominent attractions into the 5th-century CE: The poet Rutilius Claudius Namatianus describes his visit to the Aquae Tauri ("Spring of the Bull"), a spring located near Civitavecchia.

In addition to natural sources of water, religious sites in Latium often included infrastructure related to water, such as wells, drainage canals, or cisterns. For instance, alongside two cisterns, excavators have unearthed—by a set of Republican temples in Ostia—remains of a structure that likely once functioned as a well designed to facilitate access to the nearby spring of drinkable water. Another well, which also provided access to spring water, has been uncovered at Fosso dell'Incastro. This structure was probably built around the 3rd-century BCE, yet it likely remained significant to the local populace for the ensuing decades, as they seemingly proactively sought to pits functionality. Later in the 3rd century BCE, there was an effort to pave over the piazza and construct two new altars in the same area, which partially buried the well. Nevertheless, a new conical ring was attached to the structure, which allowed for the continued usage of the site.

According to John Scheid, a scholar of Roman religion, the proximity of water sources to sacred spaces provided suppliants with a convenient means by which they may perform the ablutions required in ritual worship. In Lavinium, multiple canals directed the flow of water towards the nearby sanctuary site. One such canal replaced an earlier stream and may have served primarily to drain water from the area, perhaps akin to a compluvium. The sanctuary of Fosso dell'Incastro at Ardea and the temples within the Sant'Omobono Area each utilized cisterns—both dated to the 4th century BCE—which potentially supplied any water-related needs for cult activity. Wells in particular often appear near the altars of a temple, perhaps as they were necessary to provide water for sacrifices. There is evidence of certain sacrificial rites involving water: One ancient inscription dedicated to Silvanus during the reign of Emperor Domitian (r. 81–96) mentions "water used for the purpose of the sacrifices." If the divine recipient of a sacrifice was an aquatic god, then the meat of the deceased animal could be deposited in water.

According to Vitruvius, a 1st-century BCE Roman architect, temples and shrines—particularly those of healing deities such as Asclepius or Salus—were often intentionally placed in the most "healthful" ("saluberrimae") places, which were usually defined by the presence of a spring. Vitruvius further claims that when sick individuals receive treatments from these "healthful springs of water" ("fontibus salubribus"), they recover more quickly. Festus, a 2nd-century CE Roman grammarian, similarly purports that the Temple of Asclepius was established upon the Tiber Island due to the ability of water to heal illnesses. More specifically, according to the classicist Gil Renberg, the Tiber Island was itself removed from the general pollution and open sewers of the city of Rome, perhaps contributing to its classification as a uniquely salubrious area.

In the eastern half of the empire, it was more common to construct monuments related to water, such as the fountain at Eleusis. Beyond their association with water, large-scale structures such as baths or fountains—as a consequence of their inherent opulence—likely also served as public spectacles that helped accentuate the prestige of the individuals involved with their construction and maintenance. Private civilians often provided financial support for these structures, in some cases receiving explicit commemoration of their contributions to these establishments. In the Aquae Sulis, a sacred pool in Roman Britain, one inscription termed the "Façade of the Four Seasons" documents the financial investment of an individual named Claudius Ligur, who had funded repairments and a repainting of the local sanctuary.

=== Deities ===
There were several Roman deities associated with water, including Mefitis, Cloacina, and Magna Mater, the latter two of which were also connected to ritual purification. According to the 1st-century CE Roman naturalist Pliny the Elder, the name of Cloacina was etymologically related to the verb cluō ("to cleans"). Pliny further writes that, following the rape of the Sabine women, the Romans and Sabines purified themselves with myrtle sprigs at a site later occupied by statues of Venus Cloacina. Ovid writes that a grey-haired priest in purple robes washed ("lavit") the "mistress" ("dominam"), who was presumably Magna Mater, and her sacred items. Sacred springs often acquired associations with nymphs or other deities, such as Egeria, Juturna, or the Camenae. Sometimes, thermal baths were named after divinities, such as the Aquae Neptunae or Aquae Apollinares, which were named after Neptune and Apollo respectively. Other gods emerged as the personifications of large rivers, such as the god Danuvius, who represented the Danube, and the god Rhenus, who embodied the Rhine. Archaeological evidence indicates that Roman soldiers sometimes provided votive offerings to water deities or tossed such dedications into sacred springs. For instance, excavators have unearthed a miniature ballista that was deposited—likely by a soldier—in a pool located within Bath.

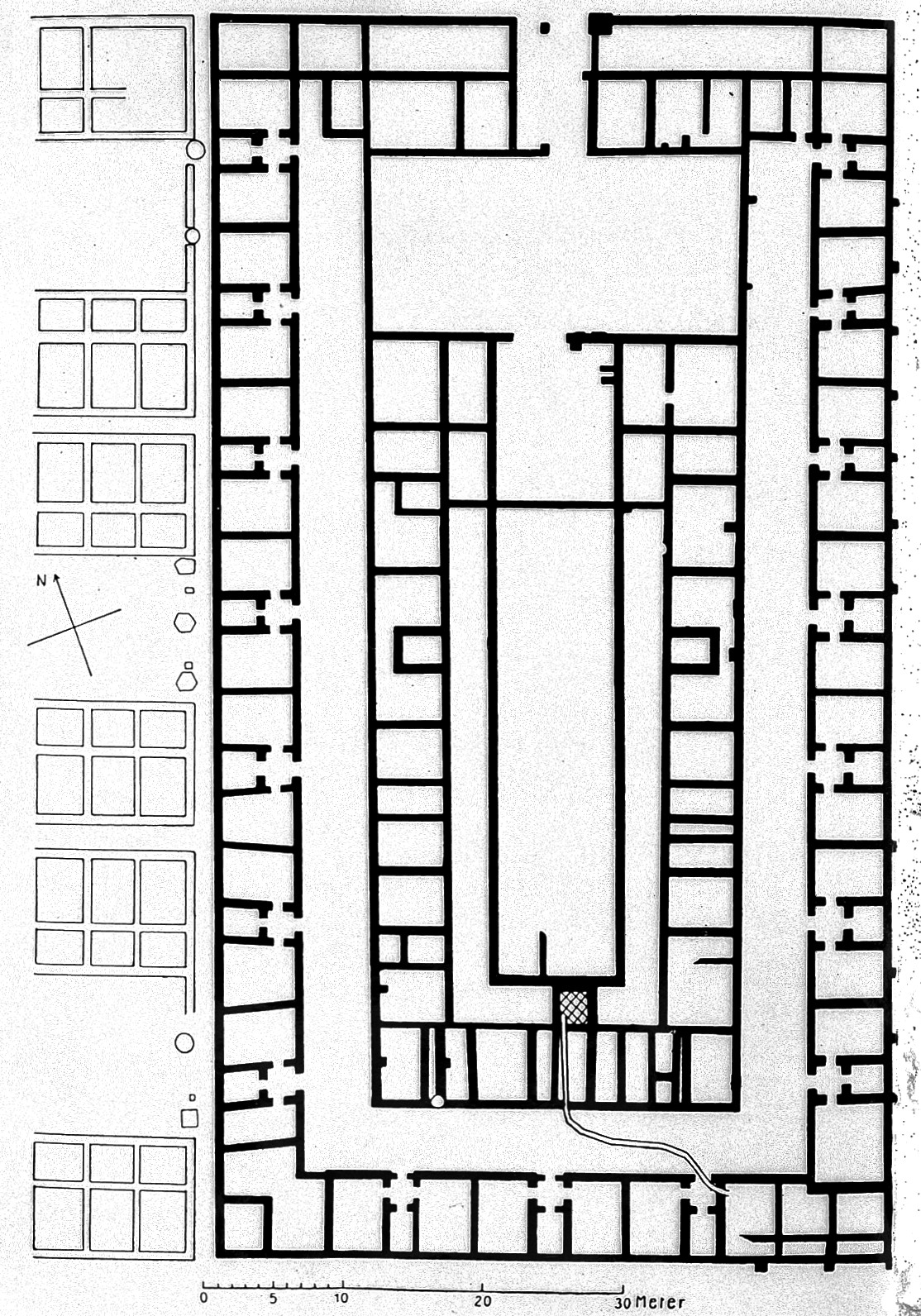
Plan of valetudinarium, near Düsseldorf, Germany. Late 1st century.

During the Imperial period, Roman baths often included statues of deities, of whom the most common—in Italy, North Africa, and Asia Minor—were Asclepius and Hygeia, which may reflect a belief in the healing capabilities of the waters. There is evidence of the importance of water to the cult of Asclepius in the provinces of Dacia and Pannonia Inferior. Near Aquincum in Pannonia, altars dedicated to Asclepius and Hygeia were devoted near a group of sacred springs that also provided the source for the aqueduct. Nearby one such spring, there was a 120 (390) × 30-metre (98 ft) large building that was supplied with water and possibly served as a hospital for the diseased. Numerous votive altars dedicated varying to gods such as Asclepius, Hygeia, and Telesphorus were uncovered near the legionary fort by Aquincum, perhaps implying the existence of a sanctuary to Asclepius attached to the valetudinarium of the encampment. In Dacia, one inscription uncovered near Mehadia records a dedication to Asclepius and Hygeia, which was made supposedly in return for the healing an individual named Iuno Cyrilla via the "divine power of these waters." Archaeological evidence for the role of water in the worship of Asclepius is more limited regarding the northern territories of the Empire, such as Noricum, Brittania, or Germania. In Roman Gaul, however, votive altars honoring Asclepius that were discovered near springs, attesting the significance of water within the cult of the deity.

== Symbolism of water ==
=== Purity ===
Water was perhaps viewed as pure, with the 1st-century CE author Pliny the Younger writing that the source of the Clitunno river was "clear and vitreous" ("purus et vitreus"). Similarly, Ovid, a 1st-century BCE Roman poet, writes that Claudia Quinta sprinkled ("inrorat") pure water from the river ("puram fluminis ... aquam") thrice upon her head. In Roman literature, the verb abluere, which meant "to wash," also often described cleansing ceremonies. The word only appears three times within the entirety of the Aeneid, and in each of those circumstances it applied to a purificatory rite. For instance, Virgil writes that the character of Turnus traveled through the Tiber River, thereby cleaning ("abluta") himself of "slaughter" ("caede"). In another section of the Aeneid, the character Anna approaches her dying sister, Dido, and offers to wash ("abluam") her wounds with water, which perhaps connects to a Greco-Roman practice of ritualistically bathing the deceased. The final appearance of the verb abluere surfaces within a passage wherein Virgil states that Aeneas considered it sinful ("nefas") to touch his household gods, the Penates, before he had cleaned ("abluero") his hands of blood using "running water" ("flumine vivo").

The 1st-century BCE Roman poet Lygdamus envisions a funeral wherein the attendants wash ("perfusae") their "sacred hands" ("pias ... manus") in a liquid ("liquore"). Though associated with death and funerary rites, the 1st-century BCE polymath Varro claims that water and fire are both vital in procreation, with water in particular representing the feminine because the embryo develops in moisture. It is for this reason, according to Varro, that water and fire both feature at Roman weddings. Festus provides two separate possible explanations for this ritual: he states that the bride was sprinkled with water either so that she may approach her husband morally pure ("casta puraque") or to share the fire and water with him. Connotations of purity are also apparent in one of Plutarch's suggested explanations: Plutarch postulates that fire purifies and water cleanses, thus they were used to ensure the bride remained "pure and clean." Servius provides additional details on the nature of the ritual, claiming that the water was taken from a "pure fountain" ("puro fonte") by a most fortunate ("felicissimum") boy or girl and used to wash the bride's feet. He also mentions that lightning, which seemingly represents a type of fire at the wedding, was simultaneously considered by some to be an ill-omen and a propitious sign.

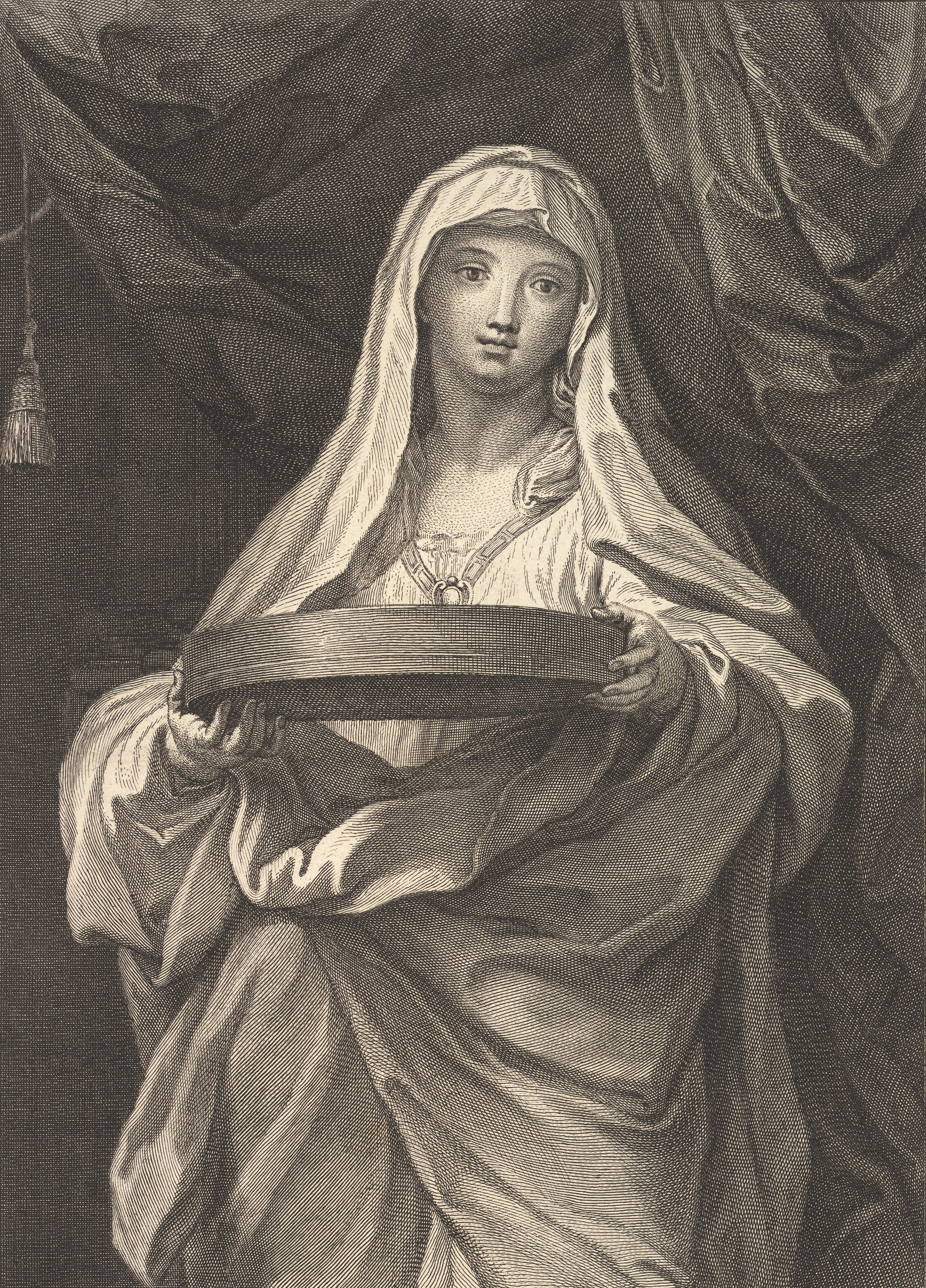
Engraving from 1720 depicting Tuccia

Servius details a practice wherein the Vestal Virgins gathered water from a river near the Porta Capena in vessels, which they were forbidden from setting upon the ground to avoid contaminating the substance with the earth. Ovid describes another water ritual involving a vestal virgin—he writes the vestal virgin Rhea Silvia setting out, in the morning, to "fetch water to wash the holy things." Another Vestal Virgin, Tuccia, is recorded by Valerius Maximus to have proven her chastity by carrying water in a sieve from the Tiber River to the temple of Vesta. Columella, a 1st-century CE writer, claims that numerous prior authors recommended that any individuals who had lost their virginity should wash themselves in a river or running water prior to touching food. These other authors, according to Columella, believed that only prepubescent children or virgins were fit to handle drinking vessels or food, and thus they considered it ideal to employ boys ("pueri") or virgin girls ("virginis") for culinary services. Ovid reports that the legendary King Numa of Rome received prophecies in a grove where he twice sprinkled upon his head water from a spring ("fontana"), twice veiled his brows with beechen leaves, remained abstinent for a protracted period, refused to eat flesh, and spurned the adornment of his fingers with any ring.

Throughout Roman religion, water frequently appeared in other purificatory rituals: In his Metamorphoses, Ovid also writes that Scylla, a mythical nymph, once underwent a ritual cleansing consisting of a magic song repeated nine times and a bathing in one hundred streams. In some circumstances, the water ritual required the washing of the hands and face—Horace, another 1st-century BCE Roman poet, mentions himself and his companions performing such a rite in a stream belonging to Feronia. Aeneas, upon waking from a dream in which the god Tiberinus appeared to him, gathered water from a river in his palms and prayed to the river god. In other situations, Roman authors describe a ceremonial sprinkling of water. According to Ovid, merchants would gather water in a fumigated urn ("urna ... suffita") and then utilize a wet bough to sprinkle water over goods they intended to sell. Ovid purports that the act of sprinkling water upon the ground and then sweeping the area with a broom was a component of a lustral ceremony designed to protect sheep.

==== Cleansing pollution ====
According to the classicist Jack Lennon, in the aforementioned story wherein a blood-stained Aeneas refused to touch the statues honoring his household gods, the blood constituted a type of "bodily impurity" that inhibited a proper meeting with the divine, thereby necessitating a purificatory ritual. Water served as the cleansing agent; it removed perceived religious pollution and thus repaired damage to the pax deorum. Tacitus, a 1st-century CE historian, writes that—as part of the purification and subsequent consecration of the site of the Capitoline Temple—the Vestal Virgins, alongside boys and girls with still-living fathers and mothers, washed ("perluere") the site with water drawn from fountains and streams. Furthermore, according to Tacitus, when Nero (r. 54 – 68 CE) bathed in the spring that provided the source for the Aqua Marcia aqueduct, he stained ("polluisse") the sanctity and ceremonies of the site ("sacros et caerimoniam loci"), causing the emperor to fall severely ill.

Livy, a 1st-century BCE Roman historian, further emphasizes the significance of purity in sacrifice: He describes an anecdote in which a Roman priest ("antistes Romanus") admonished a Sabine individual for sacrificing whilst unclean, imploring them to bathe themselves ("perfunderis") in a nearby river ("vivo ... flumine"). Valerius Maximus, a 1st-century CE Roman rhetorician, tells of an incident wherein a pater familias in the Sabine district attempted to sacrifice a cow of "exceptional size and remarkable beauty" to the gods under the promise, supposedly given to him by the most credible soothsayers, that the individual who sacrificed the animal to Diana would guarantee that their country would gain control over the world. However, Maximus records that a temple priest ("antistes templi") impeded the Sabine man by ordering him to first wash ("abluisset") himself in the nearby river. As the Sabine was bathing himself, the priest immolated the cow, supposedly awarding the Roman people with the promised dominion over the world.

In particular, the ritual purification of a threshold perhaps helped to inoculate a house against pollution. The 1st-century BCE Roman elegist Propertius writes that, when his lover Cynthia had discovered his affair with other women, she washed the threshold with water, fumigated ("suffiit") the places that the other girls had touched, demanded that Propertius chang the oil lamps, and touched his head thrice with sulfur. Ovid recounts a similar cleansing of the threshold, writing—in his rendition of the myth of Carna and the strix—that the nymph Carna aimed to protect Proca, an Alban prince, from a legendary creature called a strix through a ceremony involving the sprinkling of water thrice over the entrance of the house. In the Aeneid, Virgil describes Aeneas sprinkling water on himself before crossing the threshold into the Elysium. Festus records that, upon returning from funerals, individuals walked over fire and were sprinkled with water as part of a ritual of purgation ("purgationis") referred to as a suffitio.

=== Moving water ===
As noted by Servius, all water was perhaps perceived as religiously significant, though there is also evidence that "living" water was considered more important than others. This "living" water is probably to be defined as naturally moving water conveyed through a source such as a spring, river, or sea rather than artificially flowing water transported through pipes. According to Pliny the Elder, contemporary physicians recognized moving water as healthier than stagnant water, because the agitation ("percussu") of the currents rendered the water "finer" ("extenuari") and more salubrious ("proficere"). Numerous descriptions throughout Roman literature mention the usage of moving water within religious ceremonies, particularly those concerned a purification rite prior to a ritual. Ovid describes a ritual propriating the goddess Pales in which the suppliant is required to wash ("perlue") their hand in moving ("vivo") water. Similarly, Ovid writes that—as part of a sacrifice to Jupiter—the worshippers sought a spring with moving ("vivis") water for libation. It is perhaps possible that Roman sanctuaries were often situated nearby natural water sources or accompanied by water-infrastructure such as a well or basin as part of a desire to harness these "living" waters.

== Healing powers of water ==
=== Healing sites ===
There were numerous popular healing sites throughout the Roman world, the benefits of which were often annunciated by Roman authors. Strabo, a 1st-century BCE geographer, mentions that the popular Roman resort town of Baiae had hot springs that served visitors, including many who sought relief from sickness. Pliny writes that the waters on the island of Aenaria, the "frigid" ("frigida") waters by Teanum Sidicinum called "Acidula," waters by Stabiae called "Dimidia," water from the spring of Acidulus at Venafrum, the water from Lake Velia can all provide relief from kidney stones. Two additional sites, the "Syrian spring" ("Syriae fonte") near Mount Taurus and the Phrygian river Gallus, are also cited as potential water capable of offering the same treatments, though these claims are explicitly sourced from Varro and the 3rd-century BCE Greek scholar Callimachus. To remedy bladder illnesses, the 5th-century CE writer Caelius Aurelianus suggests that the patient may utilize the waters at a location called Aquae Auguriae. According to Pliny, even the steam that arises from water previously owned by Licinius Crassus can provide healthful benefits.

Pliny also records that the waters by Sinuessa could treat sterility in women and insanity in men. These same waters were further documented by Strabo, who wrote that the hot baths at this site could treat diseases. Another author, Martial—a 1st-century CE Latin poet—implies that a hysterical ("hystericam") woman would seek the waters at Sinuessa. Emperor Claudius allegedly visited the waters of Sinuessa for medical benefit, with Tacitus writing that his health had crumbled under the weight of his anxieties, prompting Claudius to visit the site, where he sought rejuvenation from the "gentleness of the climate" ("mollitia caeli") and the "health of the waters" ("salubritate aquarum"). Another Roman emperor, Vespasian, is recorded to have visited the waters at Cutilia, which is described by Pliny as "very cold" ("gelidissimae") and healthful to the stomach, sinews, and the whole body ("stomacho, nervis, universo corpori"). Pliny writes that the water pierced the body with a sort of "suction" ("suctu") that could be seen as almost as a bite. According to Suetonius, a 1st-century CE historian, the bowel issues of Vespasian stemmed from excessive bathing in cold water.

Suetonius writes that Augustus aimed to treat his "weakness" ("infirmitatem") with "moderation in bathing" ("lavandi raritate"). According to Suetonius, Augustus would anoint ("unguebatur") or sweat ("sudabat") himself with fire before drenching ("perfundebatur") himself with water that was either "lukewarm" ("egelida") or "made tepid by the sun" ("sole multo tepefacta"). Furthermore, Suetonius reports that—to treat rheumatism ("nervorum causa")—Augustus would rest himself upon a wooden seat, which the emperor referred to as a dureta, and dip his hands and feet into the hot Albulan waters ("marinis Albulisque calidis"), which are otherwise known to be sulfuric. Whilst commenting upon the life of a different emperor, Nero, Suetonius records that he had supplied his own baths with water from the sea and this same Albulan source.

=== In scientific thought ===
The Roman belief in the therapeutic value of water was grounded in contemporary scientific thought, such as the then-popular humoral theory. Ancient doctors believed that hot or cold water could help regulate the humors of the body, thereby combatting disease. These ideas can be traced back to at least Hippocrates, a 5th-century BCE physician who also promoted the usage of water in their writings. Hydrotherapy was favored by the Methodic school of medicine, with methodic doctors such as the 1st and 2nd century CE physician Soranus of Ephesus and Caelius Aurelianus all espousing the merits of bathing. It is likely that the particular attraction of the methodic sect to healing spas derives from their own preoccupation with pleasant treatments and their belief that diseases to result from either an excessively constricted or loosened state of the body.

According to the 1st-century CE encyclopedist Celsus, another author—the 1st-century BCE physician Asclepiades—listed water-drinking amongst his supposed "common aids" ("communium auxiliorum"). Pliny writes that Asclepiades had garnered popularity due to his rejection of treatments that were distasteful for the patient and his preference for more comfortable therapies, thus motivating his particular exaltment of bathing. Yet, Pliny still denigrates these ideals, writing that they appeal to "man's greedy love of baths." Celsus, however, rebukes this characterization of Asclepiades and explicitly states that those who believe that he had exclusively promoted enjoyable treatments were errant. Nevertheless, it is possible that the general pleasantries of baths contributed to the enduring popularity of hydrotherapy in the classical world. However, Horace despairs that cold-water treatments had led him to cease use of the hot springs at Baiae, which would imply that at least the cold-bath therapies had actually encouraged displeasurable remedies. Besides whatever comforts baths may have offered, water was also widely available and inexpensive, ensuring that the treatment remained easily accessible to the poor of Roman society.

Celsus, who introduces his encyclopedia with references to numerous Greek writers and ideas, perhaps based his own descriptions of medical bathing upon the dietetic theories popular in Greek medicine, which valued the usage of diet, exercise, or bathing to ensure health. For Celsus, the act of bathing ("lavari") was a component of the daily routine of any individual in superb health ("sanissimo"). Numerous statements made by Celsus regarding remedial bathing appear to demonstrate dietetic influence. For instance, he writes that a bath after lunch ("prandium") fattens the body, whereas a bath in hot water or on an empty stomach thins the body. Celsus also, in accordance with dietetic principles, often recommends the usage of bathing alongside other procedures, such as massaging, eating, drinking, or anointing. Only seven of the eighty-one references to bathing in the works of Celsus caution against the practice as a therapy for any specific ailment. Even still, in three of these instances, bathing is only described as alienus, which—according to the historian Garrett G. Fagan—may easily be glossed as "inappropriate" rather than explicitly "harmful." Celsus only once outright declares bathing actively detrimental: He writes that, to bathe when a wound is not properly cleaned, is "one of the worst things to do" since it may render the injury "both wet and dirty," thereby increasing the risk of gangrene.

Unlike Celsus, Pliny the Elder primarily recommends medical baths in combination with other drug treatments. For instance, to treat jaundice, Pliny recommends that the patient should receive cumin in white wine following a bath. Usually, Pliny advises that the drug be ingested following the bath, though there are several examples in which he favors the imbibement of the potion during or before the washing. Pliny does mention numerous unguent products used for skincare that are to be applied during the lavation, though some were also supposed to be utilized prior to or following a bath. Celsus and Pliny differ in regard to their descriptions of medical bathing even when discussing the same condition. For example, Pliny treats bathing as a relatively tangential aspect of the treatment for fevers, whereas he extensively describes baths as a therapy for the same illness.

Pliny's particular emphasis on mixtures of drug therapies and bathing perhaps derives, at least in part, from the larger purpose of the Historia Naturalis, which largely referenced curative baths within sections concentrated upon drugs. Yet bathing is still more prevalent in the works of Pliny than in those of Scribonius Largus, a 1st-centurt CE physician who authored a treatise also delineating the various applications of medical drugs. According to Fagan, the differences between each author regarding their views on bathing may reflect divergent attitudes towards the influence of Ancient Greek culture upon Roman society. Pliny disparaged the Greek medical science underlying the particular bathing prescriptions of Celsus, though he did not necessarily provide any replacement physiological theory to justify his preferred treatments. Instead, according to Fagan, Pliny's medicaments resemble a "litany of folksy quick fixes" rather than a cogent scientific system. Pliny, however, did not necessarily oppose the entirety of Greek medicine—he praised certain practices of Asclepiades and himself sourced information from other Greek methodic scholars, such as Themison of Laodicea.

There are still only a select few examples wherein Pliny describes bathing as injurious to health. In some circumstances, Pliny mentions bathing as accentuating factor contributing to death: He writes that must can cause death if ingested continuously following a bath without stopping for breath and that, according to another author named Fabianus, it is toxic to consume sapa with an empty stomach following a bath. There are other situations where Pliny advises that patients must avoid baths as part of a broader treatment plan. He writes that, should an individual wish to utilize the caper plant to alleviate spleen illnesses, they must shun the baths, and that a hare's rennet may ameliorate a woman's condition after having given birth, though he notes that the bath must be avoided during the day prior. Pliny claims that the benefits of water were only available for humans and no other animals. However, Virgil, in his Georgics, describes a practice intended to treat sheep scab whereby farmers submerged the flock in water. Macrobius, a 5th-century Roman author, states that—according to pontifical law—it is forbidden on holidays to wash sheep for the purpose of cleaning their wool, though it is acceptable to wash sheep to treat mange.

==== Classification of water ====
Pliny the Elder describes a multitude of differing types of water, each of which proffered unique health positives: Some waters were beneficial to the sinews ("nervis"), the feet ("pedibus"), or for the hipbone ("coxendicibus"), whereas other waters were remedial to dislocations or fractures ("luxatis fractisve"), capable of "emptying" ("inaniunt") the bowels or healing wounds, or were "specific" ("privatim") to the head or ears. Vitruvius provides a passage concerning the identification of supposedly healthy waters, in which he stipulates that the presence of clear water without any signs of moss or reeds is indicative of a salubrious spring. In modern scientific thought, spring waters are known to contain less suspended sediment, which concurs with Vitruvius's commendation of transparent streams. Within the section of his text, Vitruvius details a test designed to assess the quality of water; he advises the reader to boil the liquid in a copper vase and then check whether any dirt or mud remained at the bottom of the vessel. Alternatively, to perform the same inspection of water quality, Vitruvius mentions that an individual may sprinkle the substance upon a bronze surface and determine whether any traces were left. In particular, for the latter task, Vitruvius recommends Corinthian bronze, though he concedes that "any other good bronze" will also suffice.

According to Vitruvius, the water found on plains was typically unhealthy, because the air quickly lifts the "lightest, thinnest and most subtly wholesome" ("levissimum tenuissimumque et subtili salubritate") parts towards the sky, leaving only that which was heavy and unpleasant ("gravissimae duraeque et insuaves"). He also considers it unlikely that plains areas would even provide an adequate supply of water, as—according to Vitruvius—these regions experience greater exposure to the sun, whose rays absorb the moisture of any liquids. In contrast, Vitruvius considers mountains to be the ideal location for any water source, as—besides a supposed higher quantity of rainfall—such terrain is shielded from the sunlight by the surrounding hills and forests. As a consequence of this same diminished exposure to sunlight, according to Vitruvius, snow is allowed to persist in these regions for longer periods of time. Inevitably, the heaps of snow do melt, with the resultant water then accumulating at the bottom of valleys, whence come springs and other water sources. Ultimately, Vitruvius considers mountainous areas to possess the most healthful sources of water, describing the local springs as "sweeter, more salubrious, and more abundant ("suaviora et salubriora et copiosiora")."

Celsus designates rainwater as the lightest ("levissima") variety of water, followed by—in ascending order based on weight—spring water, river water, well water, snow or ice water, lake water, and then finally marsh water. Should a doctor encounter two waters of equal weight, Celsus writes that the superior option can be identified as the one that heats or cools faster or allows for leguminous plants to be cooked more quickly. Celsus further records that water was the "weakest" ("inbecillissima") type of drink and was best for the weakest ("inbecillis") patients. According to Celsus, during the early stages of illness, it was ideal to rest and abstain from food or drink, though he states that—if the patient were to imbibe any liquid—it ought to be water. After one day, or—should severe symptoms persist—two days, Celsus recommends that the patient recommence the consumption of food and beverages, though the former only sparingly and–regarding drink—they should consign themselves to water.

==== Hot and cold water ====
Pliny identifies "tepid and lukewarm" ("tepidae egelidaeque") waters that provide treatment for illnesses. Galen, a 2nd-century CE physician, explicitly advocates against the usage of water that is "hotter than customary" to ameliorate the condition caused by "tension of the sinew-like structures" and the other ailment caused by "superfluidities." However, Galen does recommend the usage of warmer-than-moderate water to treat "thinness," since hot water can supposedly condense, compress, and therefore thicken the skin, which—according to Galen—allows for nutriments to help fatten thin individuals. In contrast to another author called Theon, Galen largely dismisses the usage of cold water as a treatment for "thinness," stating that—though it could theoretically create the same skin compression as hot water—it was more dangerous and could also nullify the benefits of a hot bath if both substances were used in tandem. The notion that hot baths could soften the skin and facilitate the nourishment of the body did not originate with Galen—like other Roman ideas regarding the place of water in medicine, it derives from Hippocrates.

Pliny, who was staunchly opposed to Greek medical practice, claims that the advice of Hellenic physicians had enticed some individuals to partake in broiling baths so as to treat their illness, which—according to Pliny—sometimes resulted in the deaths of the patients. Furthermore, Pliny lambasts others who supposedly boast about the number of hours they are able to endure immersed in hot sulfuric water, a practice that Pliny considered to be dangerous, However, Pliny does not fully object to the usage of sulfur baths, though he does advise that individuals only remain in the sulfur for a little longer than they would usually in the balneum and that they should afterwards wash themselves with cold ("frigida") water rubbed themselves with oil. Ultimately, Pliny still seemingly accepts that hot and cold water alike can provide medical benefits, writing "to bathe the head with hot water before the hot steam of the bath, and with cold water after it, is understood to be very healthful." Pliny nevertheless considered the enjoyment of ingesting hot beverages to be unusual, writing that "no animal except man likes hot drinks, which is evidence that they are unnatural."

Asclepiades heavily favored the usage of cold-water in treatments, with Pliny claiming that—according to Varro—the doctor had earned the nickname "cold-water giver" ("frigida danda"). Emperor Augustus, whilst suffering from abscesses of the liver ("destillationibus iocinere vitiato"), had sought an "unprecedented and hazardous" therapy to ease his sickness. Augustus employed a physician named Antonius Musa, who—following the failure of hot fomentations ("fomenta")—began to utilize a cold version of the technique, which supposedly had successfully restored Augustus to health. Cassius Dio, a 2nd-century CE historian, recounts the same anecdote, specifying that Musa had utilized "cold baths and cold potions" as part of his therapy. One possible explanation for the recovery of Augustus is that the cold water had hindered the reproduction of microbes, thereby allowing for the emperor's immune system to fend off the threat.

Regardless of whatever benefit the cold-water therapy provided to Augustus, it did not work his nephew Marcellus, who—according to Cassius Dio—fell ill and received the same treatment as the emperor from the same doctor, though Marcellus soon perished. In contrast to Musa, Celsus states that there is nothing more harmful to the liver than anything that is cold, and he instead recommends the usage of water that is "hot" ("calida") during winter and "tepid" ("tepida") during summer. Nevertheless, cold water seemingly developed into a popular medical treatment amongst the Romans, perhaps in part due to the recovery of Augustus. Horace jokes that the cold-water treatment of Musa had rendered the hot springs of Baiae obsolete, as he now soaked himself in cold baths during wintertime. Pliny further documents that a particular doctor named Charmis of Marseilles spurned the usage of hot baths and had persuaded many to instead adopt the usage of cold water, even during the winter months. Moreover, according to Pliny, the most renowned spring in the whole word was the Aqua Marcia, on account of its "coldness and salubrity" ("frigoris salubritatisque").

==== Infant care ====
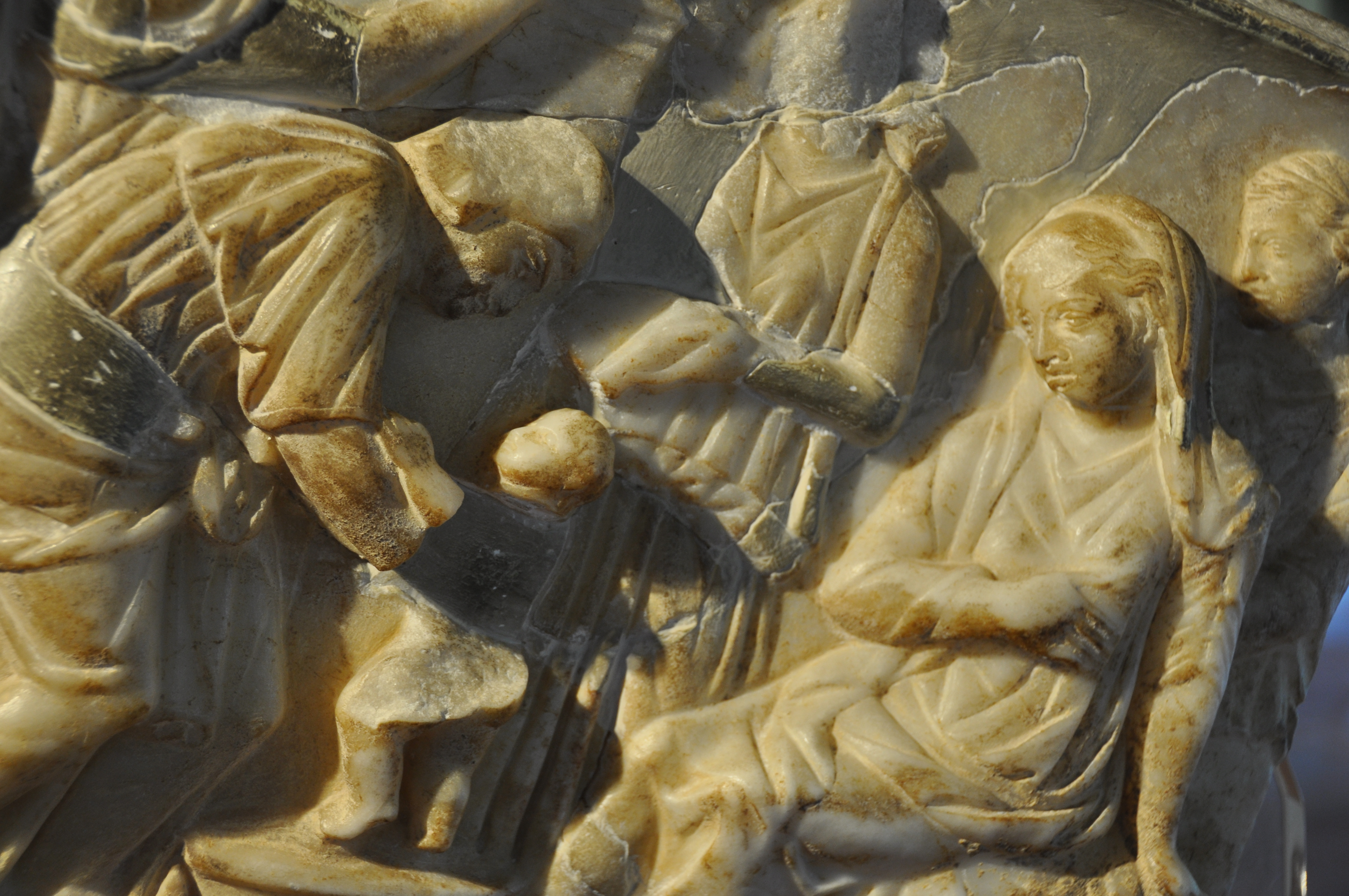
Sarcophagus from Agrigento depicting the washing of an infant

The methodic doctor Soranus of Ephesus believed that baths could be harmful during the early stages of pregnancy because it may induce a relaxed state of the body that could cause the uterus to shed the embryo. However, Soranus also believed that this same relaxatory effect was useful during the later stages of pregnancy and could also relieve the "narrow state" ("status strictus") of women afflicted with uterine or menstrual disorders. According to Soranus, pregnant women ought to fast so as to provide rest for their stomachs, though—on the following day—he recommended that the women ingest cold water. Soranus, however, notes that his proposed fasting contradicts more popular belief that expecting mothers must indulge themselves in sufficient food for two individuals. He also condemned a practice wherein infants were dipped into cold water to test their fortitude, stating that just because it did not tolerate the harm well, does not prove it was unable to live if left unharmed." Instead, Soranus advised a gentle hydrotherapeutic regimen, stating that women should utilize their right hand to pour warm water over the infant, as such a practice is pleasurable to the baby. According to Soranus, the heat of the water must be accommodated the general sensitivity of infants, who are supposedly less capable of managing hot temperatures that are otherwise safe for older people.

Soranus describes a cleaning ritual wherein salt was sprinkled upon a newborn and then water was applied to wash away the emulsions. Similar scenes are present on ancient Roman sarcophagi dated between the 2nd–3rd centuries BCE, some of which feature scenes of nurses holding infants who have been dipped into baths. There are additional, albeit uncommon, variants of the scene: In certain versions, there are two nurses, one of which holds a towel beside the basin, and other sarcophagi portray an attendant pouring water from a jug. In only one sarcophagus is there a scene where the mother is absent, with two nurses instead holding the baby wrapped in a towel above the basin. Despite their differences, all of these infant bathing scenes portray the maid handing the baby to the mother and all exclusively include women. These artistic representations also frequently contain numerous unrealistic elements—the babies usually appear older than newborns, perhaps due to attempt to emphasize the vigor of the child, and the mother is usually portrayed fully clothed and seated. Rather than conveying the factual details of a particular childbirth scene, the iconography instead possibly served a more symbolic purpose.

According to the archaeologist Maureen Carroll, these postpartum lavations perhaps served as part of a ritual designed to cleanse the baby of the blood of childbirth. The classicist Véronique Dasen further suggests that the washing of the baby symbolically represented an acceptance of both the infant and the responsibility for its rearing. However, Suetonius recounts an incident wherein the emperor Claudius, following a divorce, abandoned an infant girl named Claudia—who he claimed was the product of his freeman Boter—naked at the doorstep of the mother, Plautia Urgulanilla, despite having already undertaken to raise the child. Plutarch, in a consolatory letter to his wife, claims—possibly in reference to the aforementioned rites—that other women will receive their children into their arms "like pets" after others have "cleansed and prettied up" them.

== See also ==
- Balneotherapy
- Bathing in ancient Rome
- Sacred waters
- Thalassotherapy
- Water and religion
