= House of the Vestals Hoards =

Cache of two coin hoards found in the Roman Forum

House of the Vestals Hoards (Casa delle Vestali Hoards)
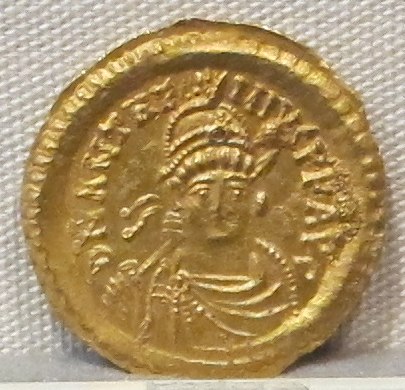
- Solidus of Procopius Anthemius (AD 467–472), Museo Nazionale Romano, Rome, Italy
- Type: coin hoard
- Material: Gold solidi, Silver pennies
- Period/culture: Western Roman Empire, Anglo-Saxon
- Discovered: Anglo Saxon Hoard: 1883, Anthemius Hoard: 1899; House of the Vestals, Roman Forum
- Present location: National Roman Museum

The House of the Vestals Hoards, or the Casa delle Vestali Hoards are a set of two coin hoards discovered in and around the House of the Vestals, on the Roman Forum during the late 19th century.

The first hoard, discovered in 1883, consisted of 836 primarily Anglo-Saxon coins as well as several artifacts. Subsequent excavations in 1899 revealed a cache of 397 gold solidi hidden under the floor of a small room in another part of the complex. This second hoard primarily consisted of coins minted during the rule of Anthemius, and was likely buried before or during the Siege of Rome in 472.

These hoards are a testament to the continued usage and activity of the Forum during the waning days of the Roman Empire, with the Anglo-Saxon hoard of 1883 providing unique insight into Holy See and British relations during the 9th century.

== Background ==
The House of the Vestals is situated behind the Temple of Vesta, and served as the primary residence of the Vestal Virgins during much of the early and high Roman Empire. The Vestal Cult was abolished shortly after emperor Gratian confiscated the cult's revenues in 382 AD.

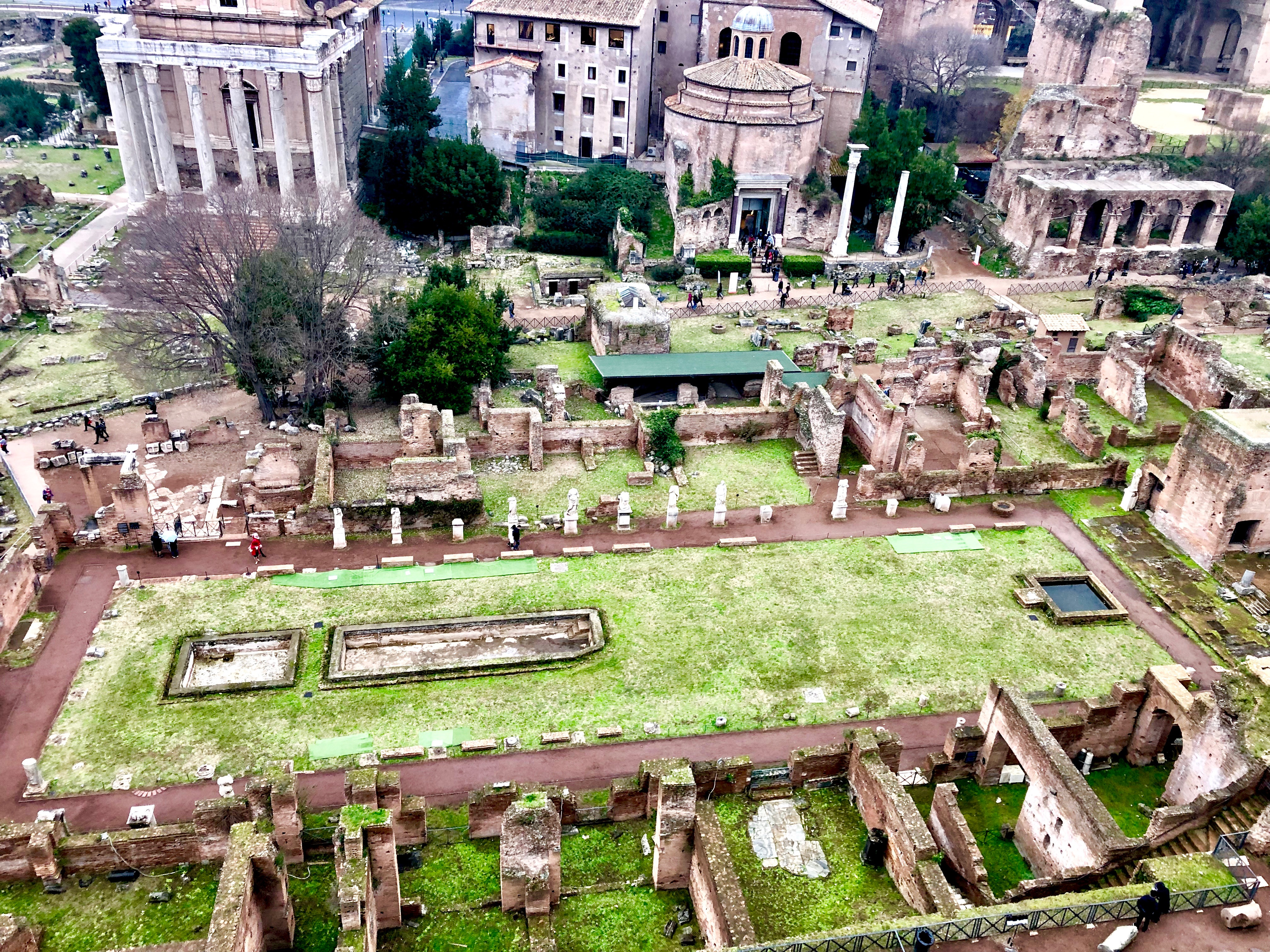
House of the Vestals viewed from Palatine Hill

It is uncertain what purpose the building served following Gratian's decree in 382. The most popular theory, first published by Esther Boise Van Deman in 1909, is that the site served as a residential building for Western Roman emperors during the 5th century. Van Deman cites the 1899 solidi hoard as evidence for her claim. However, more recent publications have stated this is insufficient evidence for such a conclusion.

Excavations were first carried out on the site in 1549, with subsequent archaeological surveys carried out in 1883, resulting in the discovery of the Anglo-Saxon hoard, as well as 1899-1902, which resulted in the discovery of the Anthemius hoard, whereupon both coin hoards were recognized and now stored in the Museo Nazionale Romano's Medagliere collection in the Palazzo Massimo alle Terme.

== Anthemius Hoard ==
The Anthemius Hoard consist of 397 solidi, discovered in the backrooms of the House of the Vestals (Northeastern forum), primarily composed of the coins of Anthemius, his wife Euphemia, along with contemporary Eastern Roman emperor Leo I.

Hoard Composition
Portrait	Date	Number of Coins	Empire
Constantius II	337-361	1 (Nicomedia)	Central
Valentinian III	422-455	7 (2x Rome, 4x Ravenna, 1x imitation)	West
Libius Severus	461-465	2 (1x Rome, 1x Ravenna)	West
Anthemius	467-472	345 (341x Rome, 4x Milan)	West
Euphemia	467-472	10 (Rome)	West
Marcian	450-457	8 (Constantinople)	East
Leo I	457-474	24 (Constantinople)	East

The study of the coins, their variants documented in the Roman Imperial Coinage, with additional contemporary hoards and die studies in Poland, Egypt, and Öland, Sweden provided insight into Anthemius' ability and limitations to pay mercenaries under his treasury, up until his demise in 11 July 472, with Sack of Rome under Ricimer. It was approximately then the cache was deposited in a sewer drain of the House of the Vestals for safe-keeping and subsequently lost.

== Anglo-Saxon Hoard of 1883 ==
The Anglo-Saxon Hoard of 1883 was discovered in a pot in the north-west part of the house, composing of three marble bases, with a medieval structure built into it, hiding under brick pavement with a terracotta base.

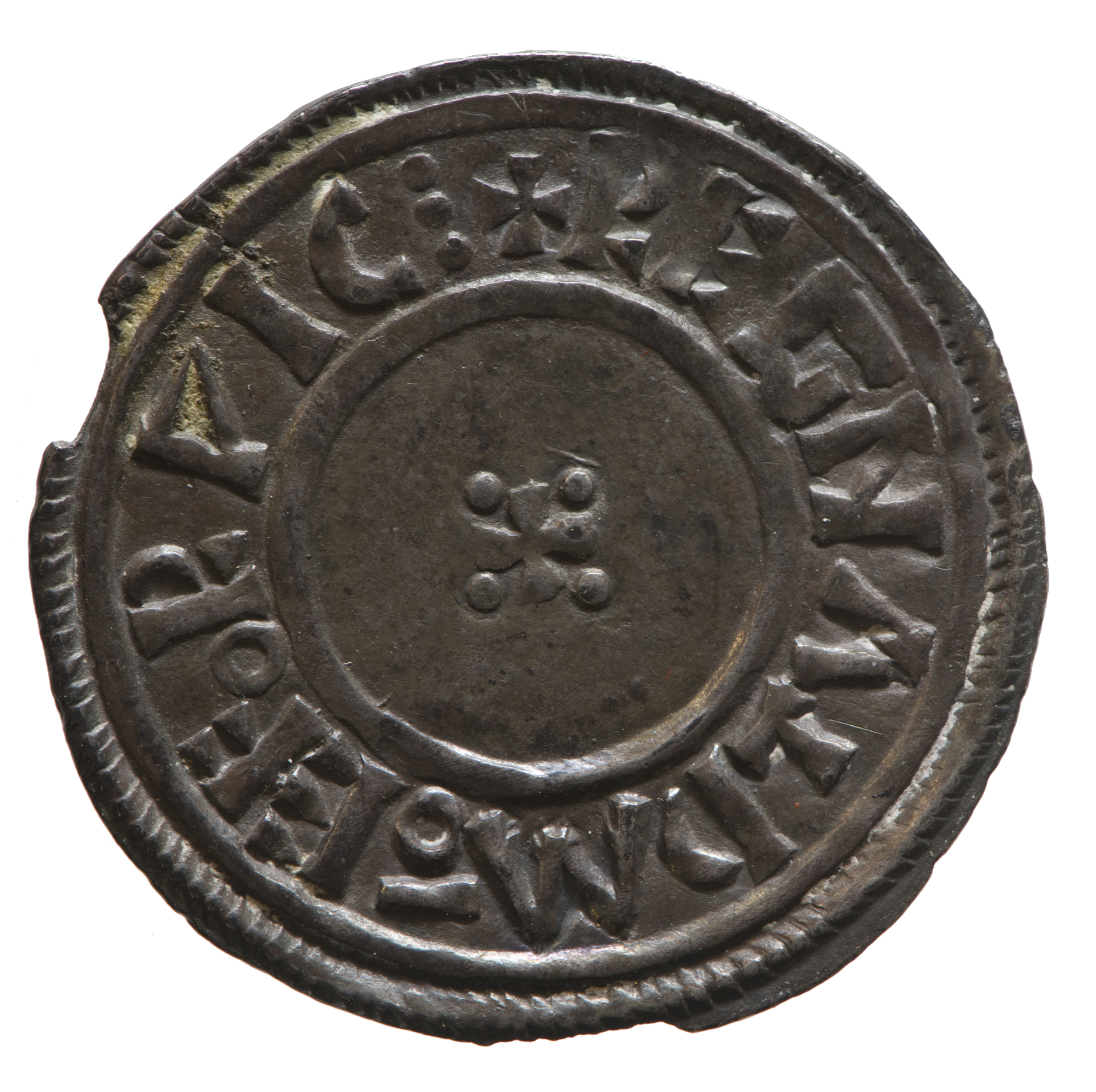
Silver Penny of Æthelstan (924-939), Yorkshire Museum

Upon its discovery, it caught the attention of the British press in two days, through The Times, where speculation of an Englishman in medieval Rome brought much public interest.

The cache primarily of silver pennies composing of coins minted under Alfred the Great (6), Edward the Elder (213), Æthelstan (396), Edmund I (200), Plegmund (4), Anlaf Guthfrithson (1), Anlaf Sihtricson (4), and Sihtricson (1). Whereas documented hoards found in Great Britain are of North or West Midlands in origin, this cache is determined to be of Southern in origin. The hoard is considered to have the largest cache of Æthelstan and Edmund I coins documented.

The coin pot was accompanied by a pair of tags:

+ DOMNO MARINO PAPA +

"To Lord Pope Marinus"

Given the nature of the origin of the coins, it is coins are likely part of Peter's Pence, coordinated with either a royal treasury or the Archbishop of Canterbury, likely in the 940s, given the composition of the pennies.

Out of seven known Anglo-Saxon hoards identified in Rome, this is considered the best preserved, and the only one found through archaeological excavations.
