= Forum Piscarium =

Ancient Roman forum in Rome

Coordinates: 41.8927°N 12.4865°E

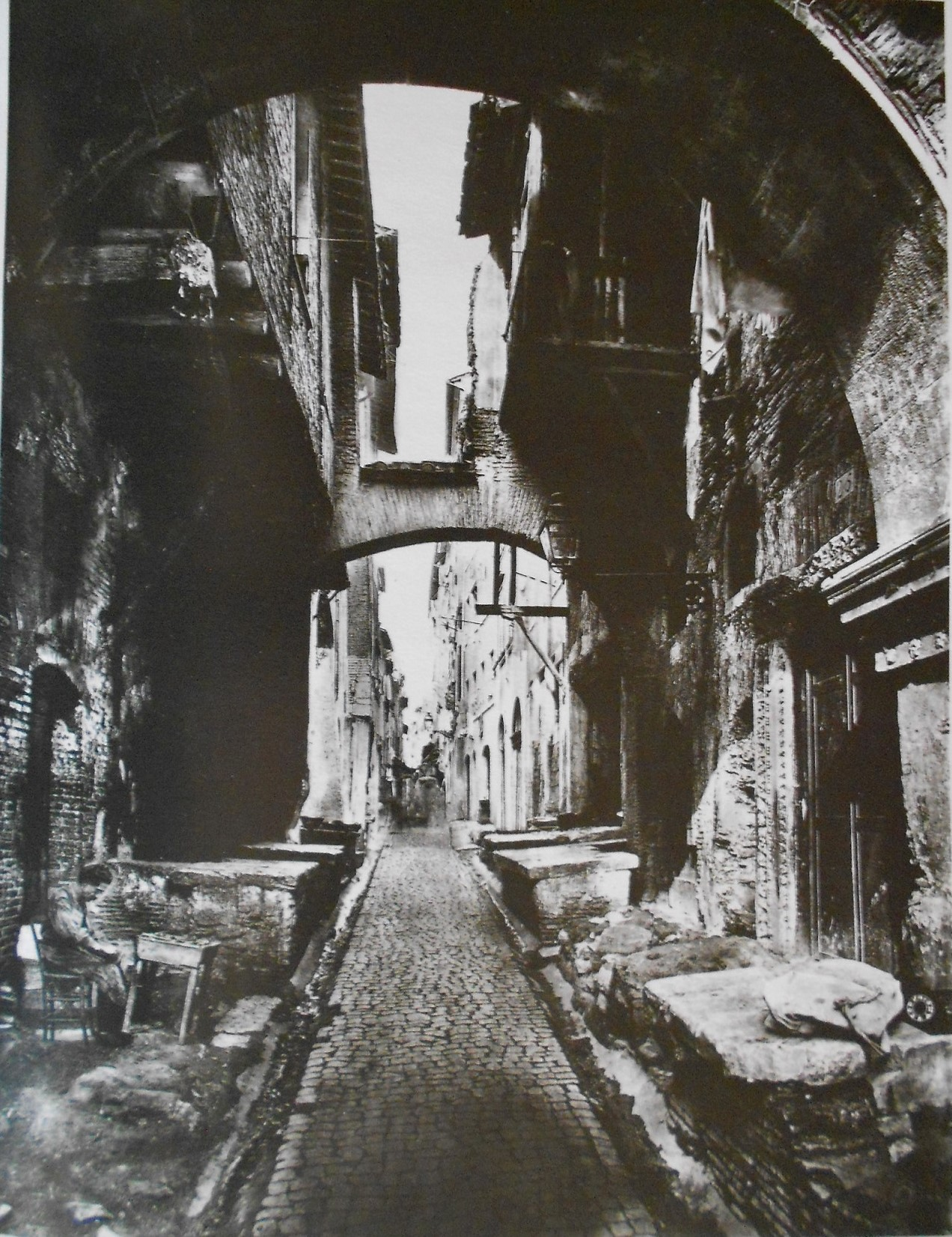
Forum Piscarium, fish market of ancient Rome

The Forum Piscarium (Italian: Foro Piscario) was the fish market of ancient Rome (a forum venalium), north of the Roman Forum, between the Sacra Via and the Argiletum. It was burned in 210 BC and rebuilt the next year. In 179 BC it was incorporated in the general Macellum, built by Marcus Fulvius Nobilior in the same region.

This forum is called piscatorium in Livy, and piscarium in Varro and Plautus (Curc. 474).
