= Regia =

Two-part structure in ancient Rome

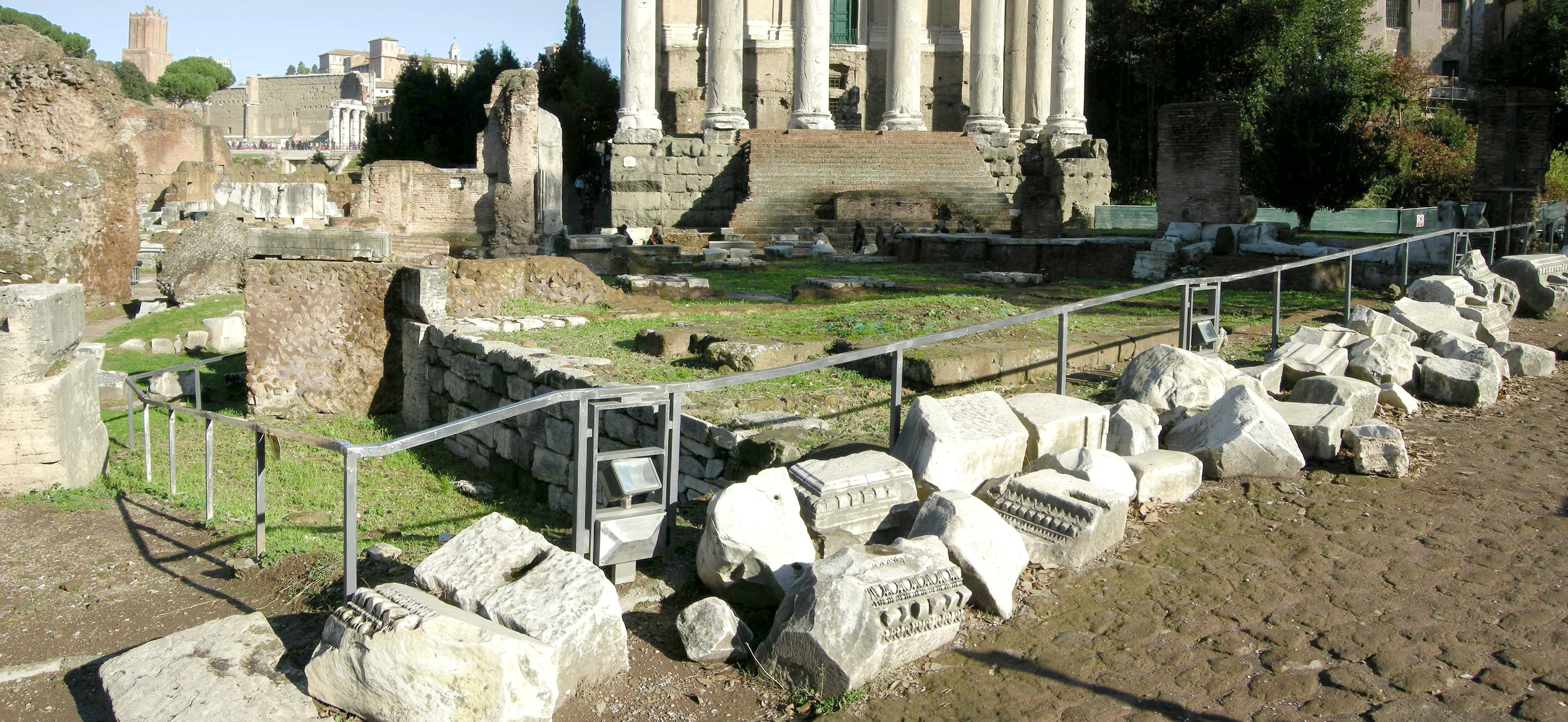
- Panorama of the ruins of the Regia

- Location within Rome
- 41°53′31″N 12°29′11″E
- Type: Ancient Type of Domus
- Location: Regio VIII Forum Romanum

History
- Built: Archaic through Imperial periods
- Built by: Unknown builder

The Regia ("Royal house") was a two-part structure in Ancient Rome lying along the Via Sacra at the edge of the Roman Forum that originally served as the residence or one of the main headquarters of kings of Rome and later as the office of the pontifex maximus, the highest religious official of Rome. It occupied a triangular patch of terrain between the Temple of Vesta, the Temple of Divus Julius and Temple of Antoninus and Faustina. Only the foundations of Republican/Imperial Regia remain. Like the Curia it was destroyed and rebuilt several times, as far back as the Roman monarchy. Studies have found multiple layers of similar buildings with more regular features, prompting the theory that this "Republican Regia" was to have a different use.

== History ==
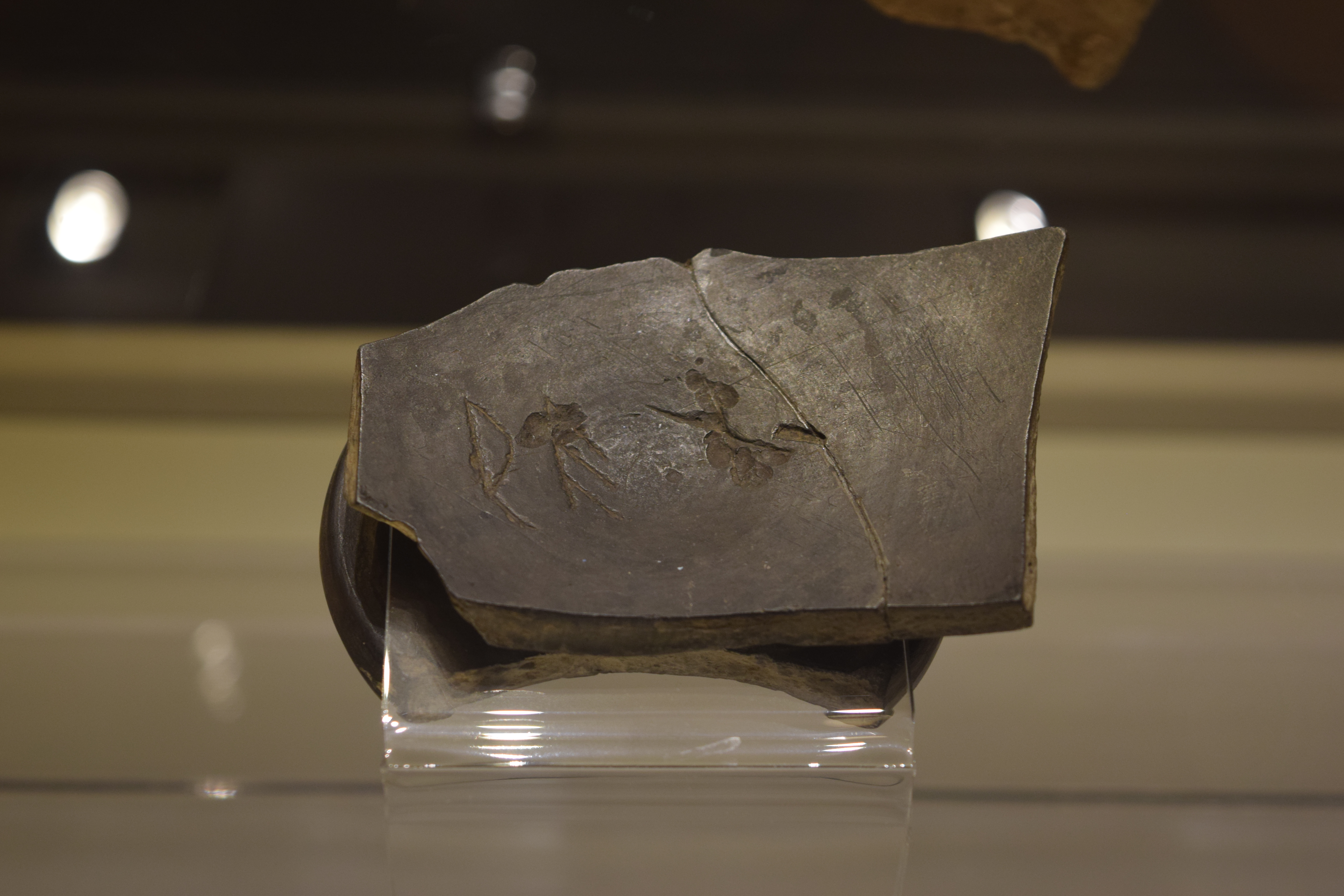
Bucchero pottery sherd from the Regia inscribed "Rex"

According to ancient tradition it was built by the second king of Rome, Numa Pompilius, as a royal palace. Indeed, the Latin term regia can be translated as royal residence. It is said that he also built the Temple of Vesta and the House of the Vestal Virgins as well as the Domus Publica. This created a central area for political and religious life in the city and Kingdom. When Caesar became Pontifex Maximus, he exercised his duties from the Regia.

The archives of the pontifices were kept here, the formulas of all kinds of prayers, vows, sacrifices, etc., the state calendar of sacred days, the Annales — the record of events of each year for public reference — and the laws relating to marriage, death, wills, etc.

The Regia was the place of assembly of the College of Pontiffs and at times of the Fratres Arvales. It was burned and restored in 148 BC and again in 36 BC, eight years after the death of Julius Caesar, when the restoration was carried out in marble by Gnaeus Domitius Calvinus, on the regal foundation.

== Architecture ==
The rebuilt structure (which seems to have been transformed into a private residential building sometime during the 7th or 8th centuries) had an irregularly formed enclosed courtyard that was paved in tuff with a wooden portico. The interior was divided into three rooms with entrance from the courtyard into the middle room.

The West Room was the shrine of Mars, sacrarium Martis, in which the ancilia (shields) of Mars were stored. Here, too, stood the lances that were consecrated to Mars, the hastae Martiae. According to legend reported by Aulus Gellius, if the lances started vibrating something terrible would happen. According to Cassius Dio (XLIV.17.2), they are said to have vibrated on the night of 14 March 44 BC when, in spite of the vibrating lances, Caesar, Pontifex Maximus at the time, left the Regia to attend a meeting of the Senate, where he was assassinated.

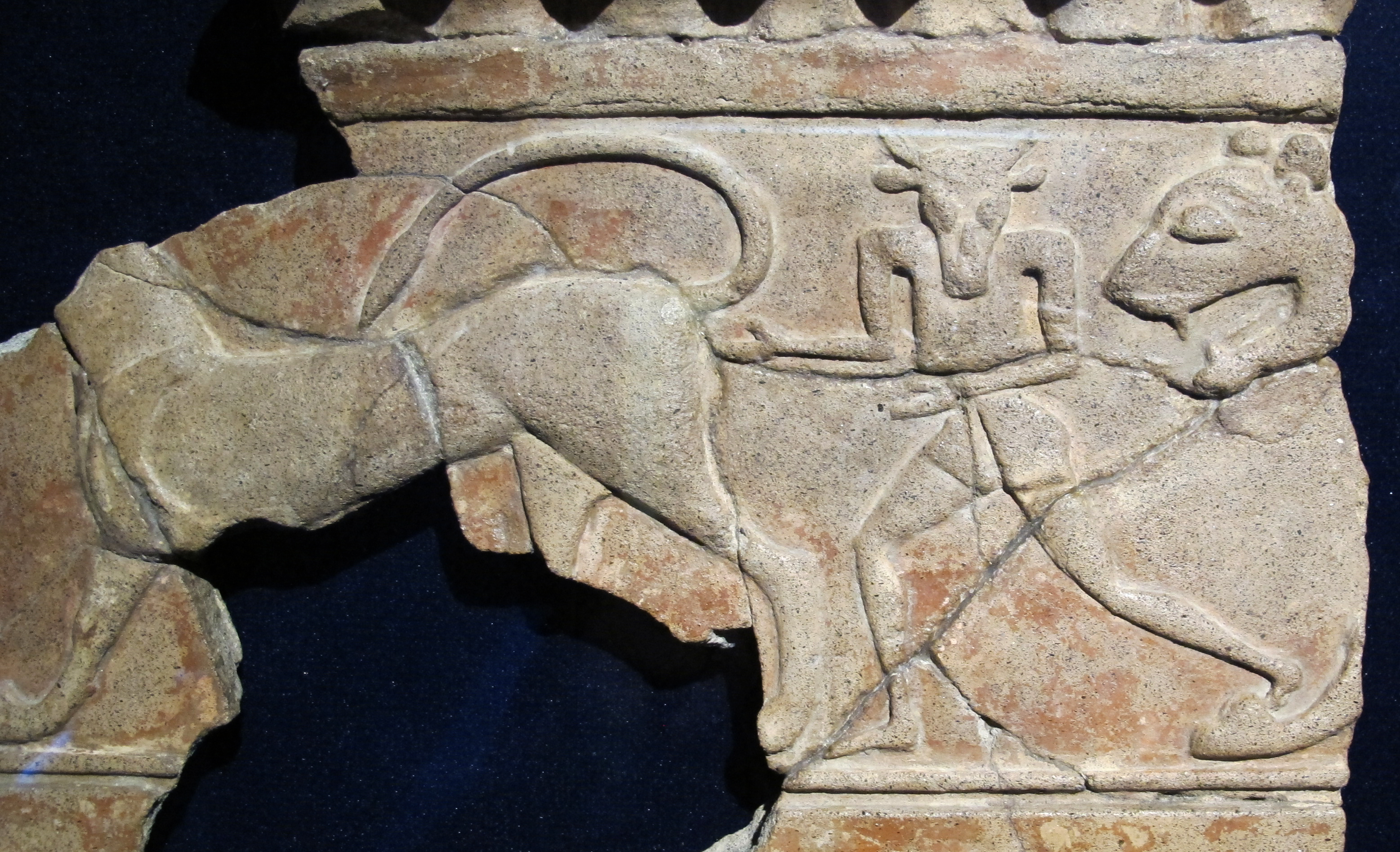
Fragment of a terracotta frieze plaque from the Regia showing a minotaur and felines, c. 600–550 BC, Antiquarium del Foro Romano

The East Room contained a sanctuary of Ops Consiva, so sacred that only the pontifex maximus and the Vestal Virgins were allowed to enter it.

The site of the Regia has been investigated via archaeological excavation for some time, although a comprehensive publication of the site is still forthcoming. The site was first cleared between 1872 and 1875. In 1876 F. Dutert discussed the site in his volume on the Forum Romanum, and, subsequently, Nichols identified the site as being the Regia in 1886. The site was explored again by Hülsen in 1889. The Italian archaeologist Giacomo Boni conducted excavations at the site in 1899. The American archaeologist Frank Brown dug at the site in the 1930s and again in the 1960s. The architectural terracottas from the Brown excavations were published in 1995.

== Sources ==
- Brown, F. E. 1935. "The Regia." Memoirs of the American Academy in Rome 12:67–88.
- Carnabucci, E. 2012. Regia : nuovi dati archeologici dagli appunti inediti di Giacomo Boni. Rome: Edizioni Quasar. ISBN 9788871404998
- Downey, S. B. 1995. Architectural terracottas from the Regia. Ann Arbor: University of Michigan Press. ISBN 9780472105717
- Losehand, Joachim (2007). Häuser für die Herrscher Roms und Athens?: Überlegungen zu Funktion und Bedeutung von Gebäude F auf der Athener Agora und der Regia auf dem Forum Romanum. Hamburg: Dr. Kovac. ISBN 978-3-8300-3397-4.
