= Forum venalium =

A forum venalium (pl. fora venalium) was a food market in Ancient Rome during the Roman Republic and Roman Empire. These mercantile fora were extensions of the Roman Forum and contained numerous buildings and monuments erected under the Republic and the Empire.

In his Politics, Aristotle proposed that a city should have both a free square in which "no mechanic or farmer or anyone else like that may be admitted unless summoned by the authorities" and a marketplace "where buying and selling are done... in a separate place, conveniently situated for all goods sent up from the sea and brought in from the country."

The Roman Forum was originally used for athletic games and trading purposes of all kinds; however, the forum became a political and banking center where bankers and brokers had their offices. The forum civilium (judicial) and fora venalium (mercantile) came into existence under the empire because of the growth of the city and the increase in provincial business. Maenius, one of the Censors, was chiefly instrumental in bringing about these changes.

The smaller fora venalia that specialized by type of produce were started along the Tiber, near Port Tibernius, with the Suarium at the foot of the Quirinal Hill towards the Campus Martius. The Boarium Forum for cattle, Forum Cuppedinis for delicatessen, Forum Holitorium (cabbage market) for vegetables, Forum Suarium for pork, Forum Piscarium for fish, Pistorium Forum for bread, and Forum Vinarium for wine.

The Roman Forum, and the Fora of Caesar and Augustus were fora civilia.
