= Forum civilium =

Judicial center in ancient Rome

A forum civilium (pl. fora civilia, "civil forum") was a judicial center in ancient Rome. These judicial forums were extensions of the Roman Forum, which had become congested with commercial and civic activity.

The three major civic forums were the Forums of Caesar, Augustus, and the Roman Forum. The forums were not used for commercial activity, but used as a meeting place for dealings in public affairs as well as the noblest activities that were before held in the Forum.

Julius Caesar built the first Imperial Forum 56–54 BC to relieve congestion in the old forum.

The Forum of Augustus was built to celebrate Augustus's victory over Brutus and Cassius, the assassins of Julius Caesar. The temple was dedicated to Mars Ultor (the Avenger) and was adorned with statues; on the attic of the porticos ran a decoration of female figures (caryatids) and clipeus. This forum has incredible architecture for the time. In conjunction with the establishment of the fora civilia, commercial activity was moved from the Forum and started in the forum venalium along the Tiber.
