= Temple of Vesta =

Ancient religious monument in Rome, Italy

- Aedes Vestae (Latin)
- Tempio di Vesta (Italian)
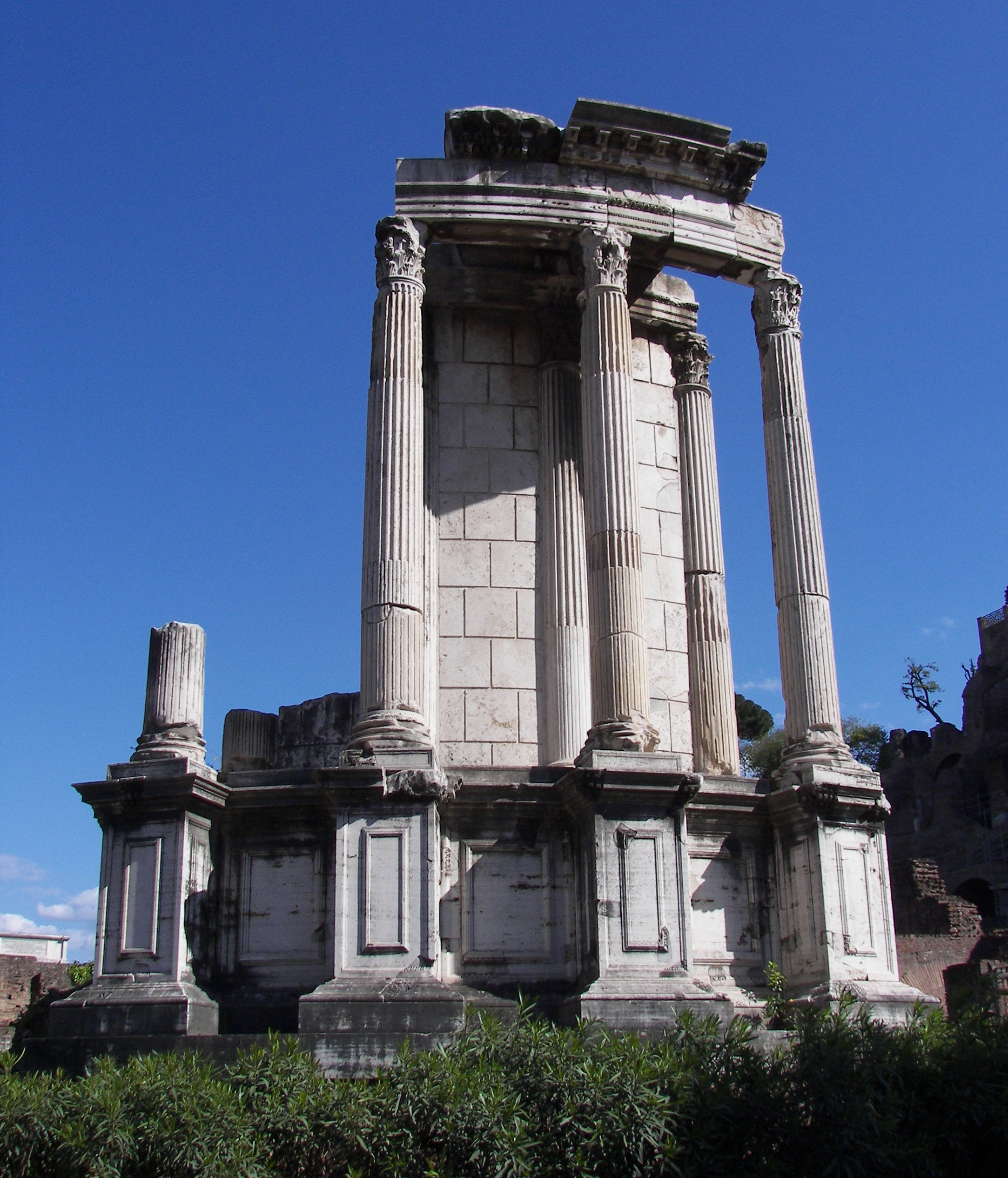
- The partially reconstructed circular podium and Corinthian colonnade of the Temple of Vesta.

- Shown within ancient Rome
- Interactive map of Temple of Vesta
- 41°53′30″N 12°29′10″E
- Location: Rome, Italy

History
- Built: 7th century BCE (Original foundation); 191 CE (Current visible structure)
- Built by: Numa Pompilius (Original); Julia Domna (Final reconstruction)

Site notes
- Area: Roman Forum

The Temple of Vesta, or the aedes (Latin: Aedes Vestae; Italian: Tempio di Vesta), was an ancient edifice in Rome, Italy. It is located in the Roman Forum near the Regia and the House of the Vestal Virgins. The Temple of Vesta housed Vesta's holy fire, which was a symbol of Rome's safety and prosperity. The temple has a circular footprint, making it a tholos.

Since the worship of Vesta began in private homes, the architecture seems to pay homage to the architecture of early Roman homes. The temple's current, ruinous form employs elements of Greek architecture with Corinthian columns and marble. The sacred hearth was housed in a central cella. The surviving structure indicates that there were twenty Corinthian columns built on a podium fifteen meters in diameter. The roof probably had a vent at the apex to allow smoke to escape.

== History ==
=== Origins ===
The first Temple of Vesta was built by Numa Pompilius, the second king of the Roman Kingdom. He also built the original Regia ("king's house") and the House of the Vestal Virgins, and founded the priestly order of Vestal Virgins. At first there were just two Vestals, but by the end of the Republic, there were six. Vesta was the goddess of Rome's hearths. The Romans believed that her sacred fire was closely tied to the fortunes of the city, and that its extinction signified imminent disaster for Rome. Although it is known as a temple in modern times, its site, orientation and floor plan were not determined through augury. It was therefore known as a shrine (in Latin, aedes).

=== The aedes and the Vestals ===
The Temple of Vesta was tended by the six Vestal Virgins, drawn between the ages of 6 and 10 from freeborn, or traditionally, aristocratic families. They surrendered all legal connections with their birth family, and came under the authority of the pontifex maximus, Rome's chief priest. The Vestal oath of virginity during their 30-year tenure set them apart from other Roman women. While chastity until marriage was considered proper in Rome, long-term celibacy was not, as women were generally expected to marry, and give birth to heirs for their husbands. A Vestal who broke her vow of chastity during her priestly tenure disrupted the relationship between Rome and its gods. The Romans believed that this would lead to disaster, such as pestilence, social breakdown or military defeats.

For minor failures of duty, Vestals could be whipped. For breaking their vow of chastity, a Vestal could be condemned to a living burial in a subterranean cell within the city boundary, with a little food and water, and left to die. If disasters struck, in any form, Vestals who seemed less than perfect in attitude, morals or behaviour might be accused of secretly breaking their vows and thus causing the disaster. For example, in 114 BC, a virgin girl of equestrian family, named Helvia, was killed by lightning while on horseback. Her death was interpreted as a prodigy, proof of potentially disastrous oath-breaking by one or more Vestals; after investigations three Vestal Virgins were sentenced to death for inchastity, on the flimsiest of evidence. Vestals were required to show a near supernatural level of moral superiority. Failures, and their punishment, were extremely rare. The respect and social privileges that came from their position, a generous pension, and a complete lack of personal experience of the duties attached to Roman marriage, seems to have encouraged many to remain in the priesthood after their term of service had officially ended.

=== Building ===
The temple of Vesta was unique in its design, as it was round as opposed to rectangular like many other temples. The circular shape of the Vesta temples were based on the primitive round hut. Some researchers argue that the circular footprint of the Temple of Vesta was meant to symbolize the earth and the domed roof symbolized the heavens. All temples to Vesta were round, and had entrances facing east to enhance the connection between Vesta's fire and the sun as sources of life. The Temple of Vesta represents the site of ancient religious activity as far back as the 7th century BCE.

Archaeologists have found that the Temple of Vesta was built on a circular foundation. Circling the exterior of the temple were twenty fluted columns. Each column was 0.52 meters in diameter, with a base 1.6 meters in circumference. The columns were topped with a Corinthian capital. The radius of the temple was about 6.19 meters. This measured from the outer line of the architrave to the middle of the temple. The interior wall is 0.60 meters thick and the diameter of the inside of the temple is 8.6 meters. The Temple was on a high platform and wide steps lead up to the entrance.

=== Location ===
It was one of the earliest structures in the Roman Forum, although its final form was the result of subsequent rebuilding. While most Roman temples held a cult statue, Vesta's had a hearth and flame that burned continuously, day and night. The temple was the storehouse for the legal wills and documents of Roman Senators and cult objects such as the Palladium, a statue of Athena (Roman Minerva) believed to have been brought by Aeneas from Troy; the statue was felt to be one of the Pignora Imperii, or pledges of imperium, of ancient Rome. The temple was closed during the persecution of pagans in the late Roman Empire in the 4th-century. The Temple of Vesta, the Atrium of the Vestal Virgins (House of the Vestal Virgins), and the Regia are the earliest evidence of the Cult of Vesta. The original Temple of Vesta stood on the east end of the forum near the house of the Vestal Virgins and the Regia. Beyond that cluster of buildings is the Via Sacra (Sacred Way) which ran uphill. This cluster of buildings was destroyed in the great fire of 64 AD; the temple was rebuilt by Trajan over several years. Another rebuilding was sponsored by Julia Domna, wife of Septimius Severus.

=== Building history ===
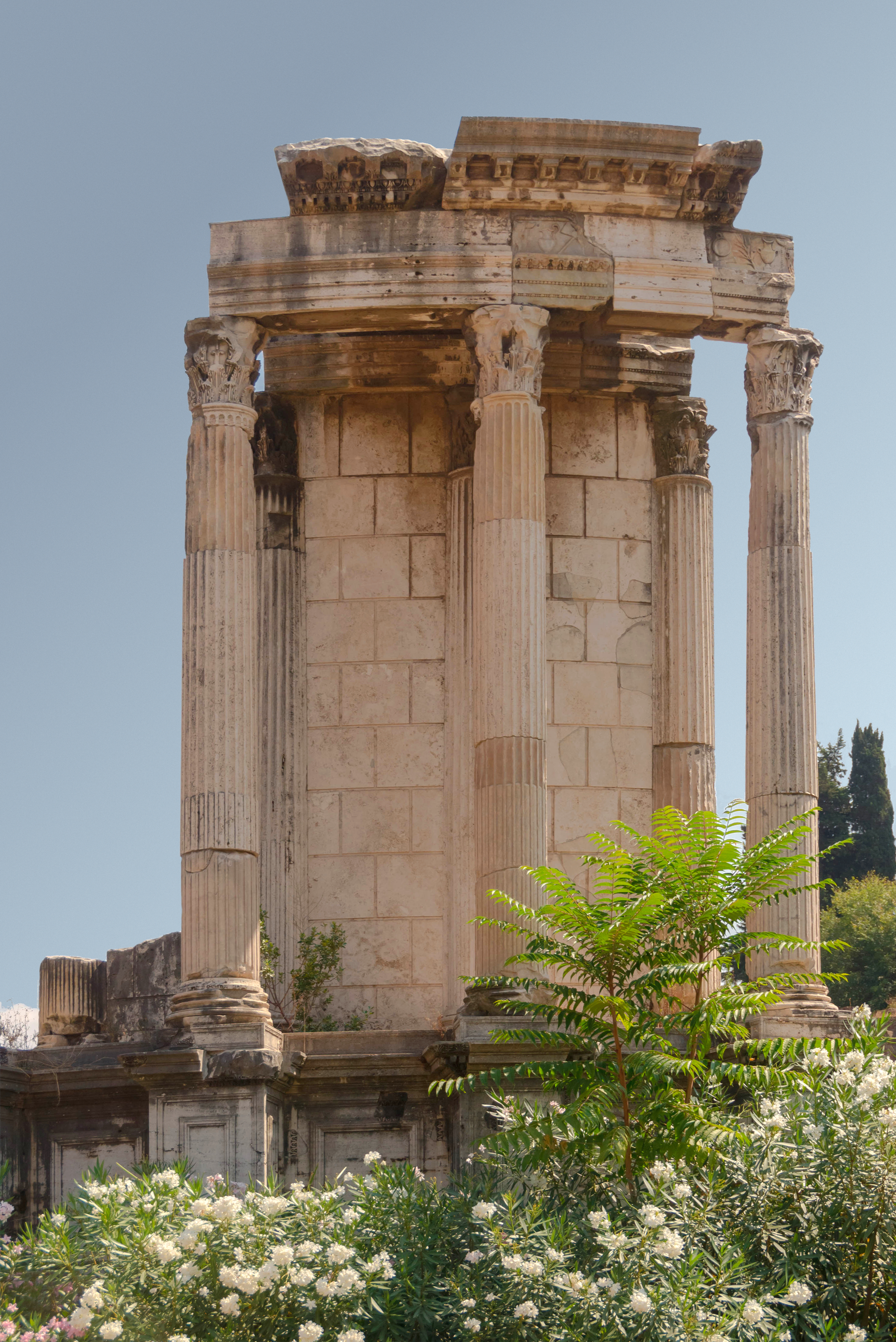
Outer wall of the Temple of Vesta

The temple was destroyed and rebuilt many times. The first destruction of the temple was by the Gauls in 390 BC. Livy records that after the Gauls burned down the temple, they soon returned to find that the Vestals had rekindled their sacred fire among the ruins of the temple. According to Ovid, the second destruction in 241 BC may have started because of the fire in the temple itself. During the fire, the Vestals were unable to collect the cult objects, and they were destroyed along with the Temple of Vesta. Lucius Caecilius Metellus, the Pontifex Maximus at the time, went into the burning temple to save the palladium. Lucius Caecilius was blinded by the flames, and it was believed that this was the result of him breaking the tradition of the temple which barred men from entering. Fires also occurred again in 210 BC and again in the early first century BC. The temple was rebuilt again during the reigns of Augustus and Nero. Finally, it burned down in 191 AD and was rebuilt for the last time during the reign of Septimius Severus by his wife, Julia Domna.

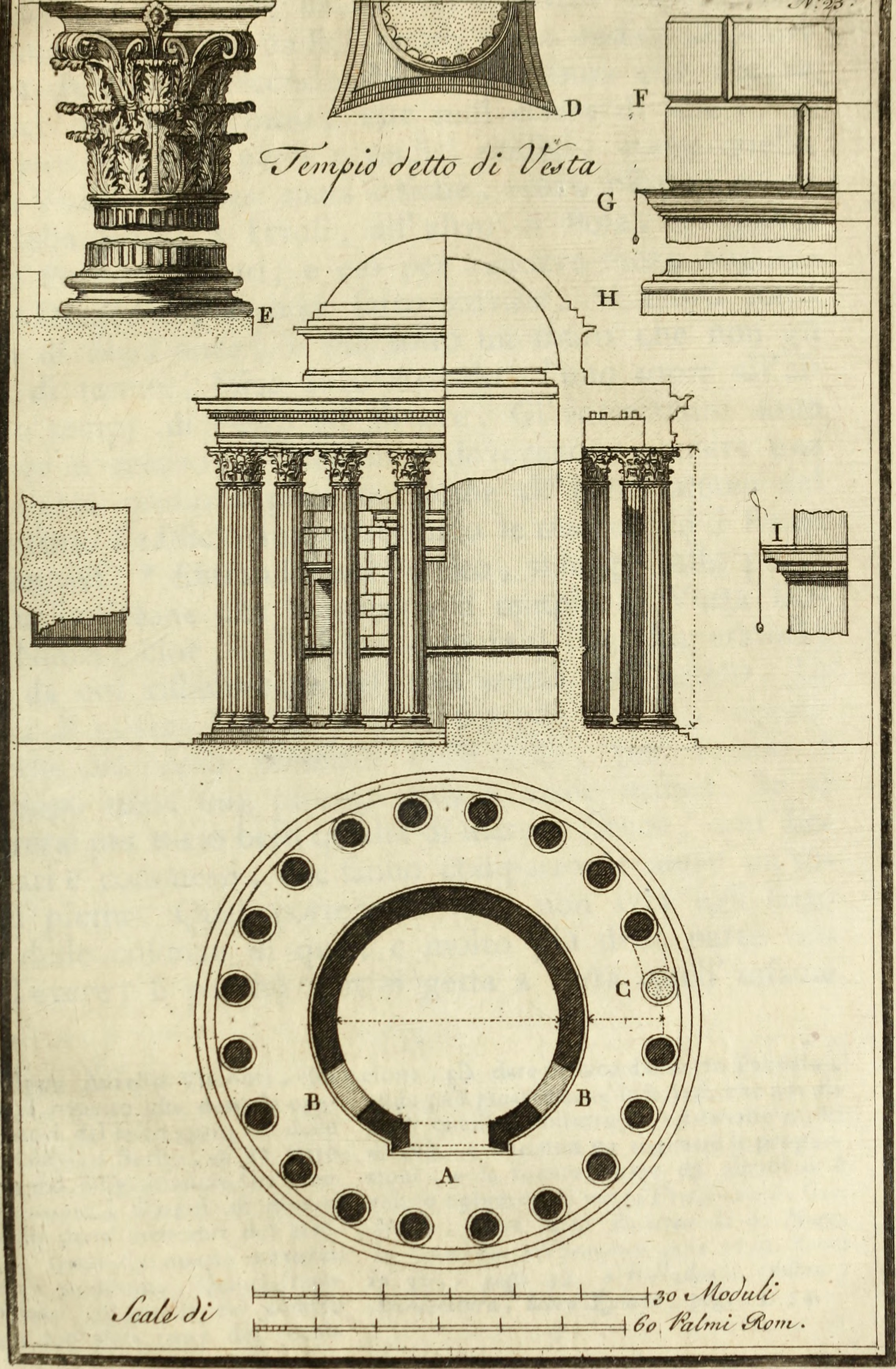
1805 Illustration of the Temple of Vesta.

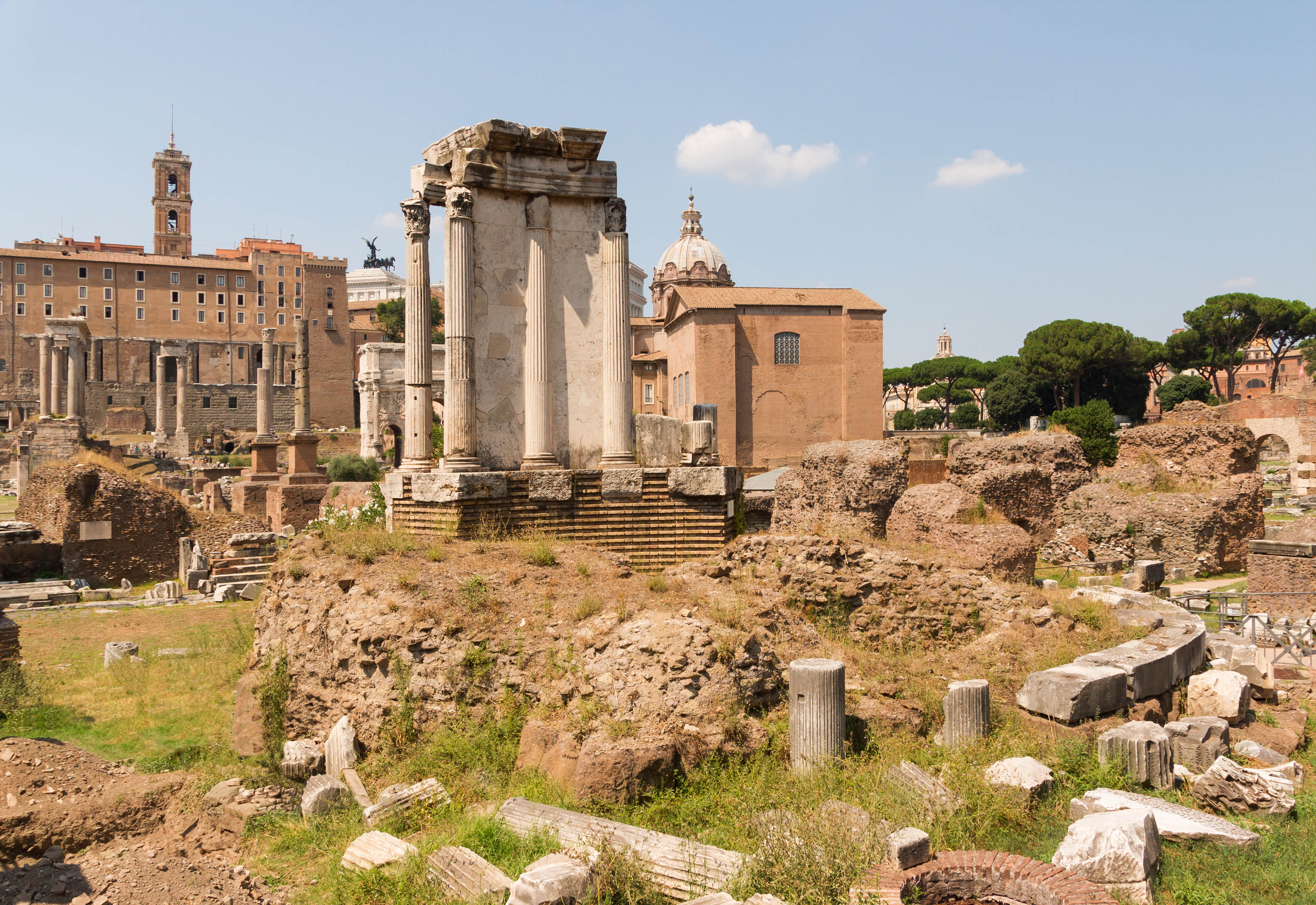
The most prominent feature of the ruins that were once the Temple of Vesta is the hearth.

== Fate of the Sacred Flame ==
The sacred flame was finally extinguished in 394 AD by Theodosius I, during the persecution of pagans in the late Roman Empire on account of the rise of Christianity in the empire.

== Modern-day Temple of Vesta ==
=== Modern reconstruction ===
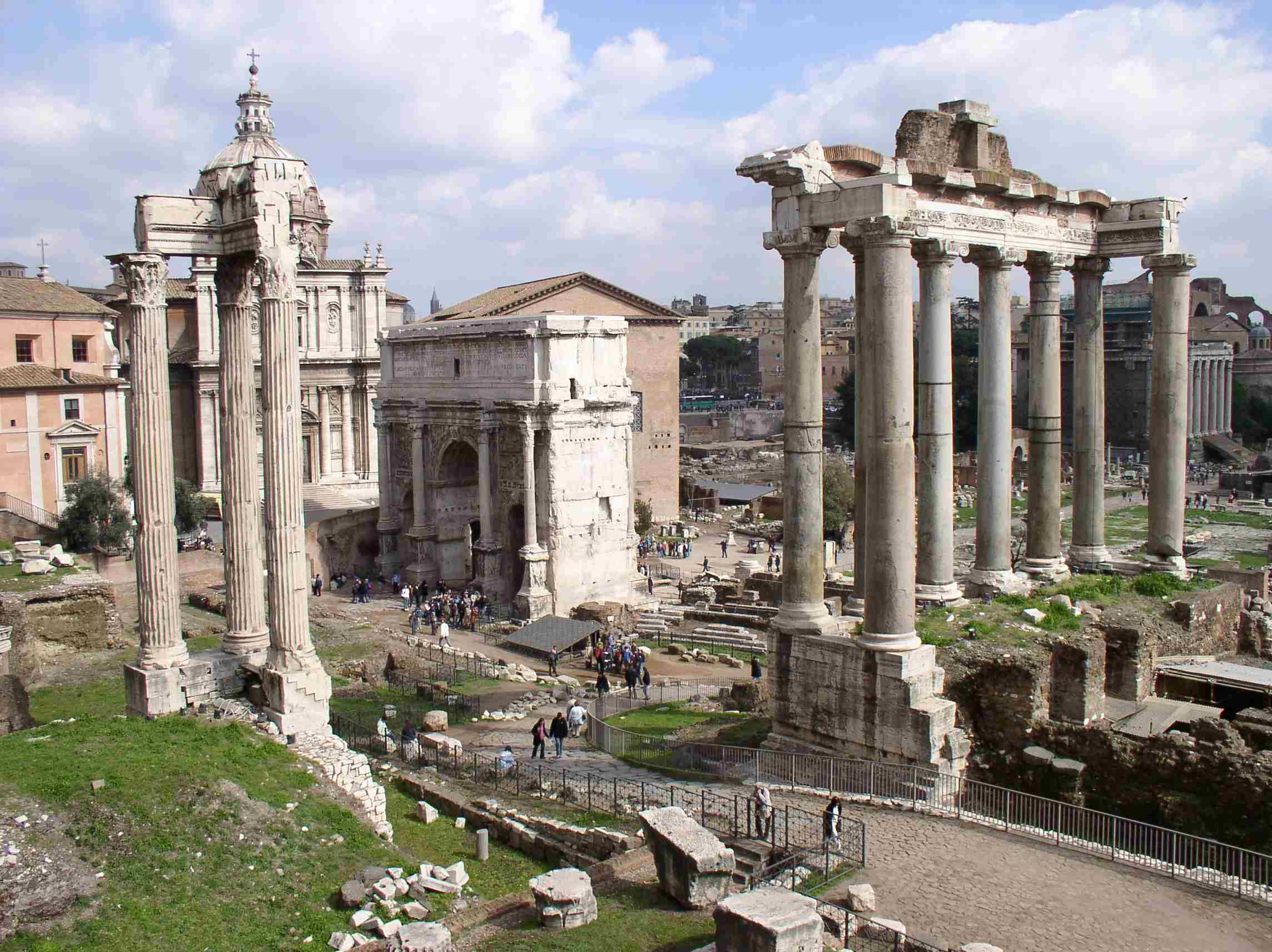
The Roman Forum in modern day

The Temple of Vesta remained reasonably intact until the Renaissance. However, in 1549 AD, the temple was demolished, and its marble was repurposed to build churches and papal palaces. Most of our knowledge about what the original Temple of Vesta looked like come from its depictions on coins and art. One piece of art that depicts the Temple of Vesta is a marble relief in the Uffizi in Florence, Italy. These depictions and others like it allow us to understand what the temple looked like in antiquity.

Modern archaeological investigation began on the site of the Temple of Vesta in the late nineteenth century. The exploration began in 1877 with archaeologist R. Lanciani's excavation of the Temple of Vesta and the publishing of his findings. During his exploration he was able to uncover many parts of the Temple of Vesta, including parts of the entablature and ceiling. Exploration continued from 1898 to 1900 when Giaccomo Boni, director of the Roman Forum, embarked on a new round of excavations. His works were published in 1900 and included measurements and sections of the temple's foundation, photos and drawings of the principal architectural elements, and a restored plan of the building. Finally, in 1930-1931 Alfonso Bartoli reconstructed two and a half of the Temple of Vesta's bays, which can still be seen in the forum today.

== See also ==
- Largo di Torre Argentina – Ancient religious monument in Rome, Italy
- List of ancient Roman temples
- The round Temple of Hercules Victor in the Forum Boarium was initially thought to be a temple of Vesta.
- The Temple of Vesta, Tivoli
- 16th-century Western domes

| Preceded by Temple of Saturn | Landmarks of Rome; Temple of Vesta | Succeeded by House of the Vestals |
