= Forum Pistorium =

Ancient Roman forum in Rome

Located most likely on the Aventine Hill, the Forum Pistorium or the forum of the bakers numbered as a forum venalium of ancient Rome. This forum is mentioned only in the Regionary Catalogues as belonging to regio XIII, placing it most likely at the southern end of the Aventine.
