= Forum Suarium =

Ancient Roman forum in Rome

Coordinates: 41.8992°N 12.4839°E

The Forum Suarium was the pork forum venalium of ancient Rome during the empire, mentioned first in two inscriptions dating c. AD 200. This market was near the barracks of the cohortes urbanae in the northern part of the Campus Martius, probably close to the present Via di Propaganda, and its administration was in the hands of the prefect or of one of his officers.
