= Forum Vinarium =

Ancient Roman forum in Rome

Coordinates: 41.8760°N 12.4716°E

The Forum Vinarium (Italian: Foro Vinario) was the wine forum venalium of early Ancient Rome. It was located in the area of the modern quartiere Testaccio, between the Aventine Hill and the Tiber.

A series of inscriptions from outside the walls of Rome connects the Forum Vinarium to a group of money lenders (argentarii).
