= House of the Vestals =

Archaeological site in Rome, Italy

House of the Vestal Virgins
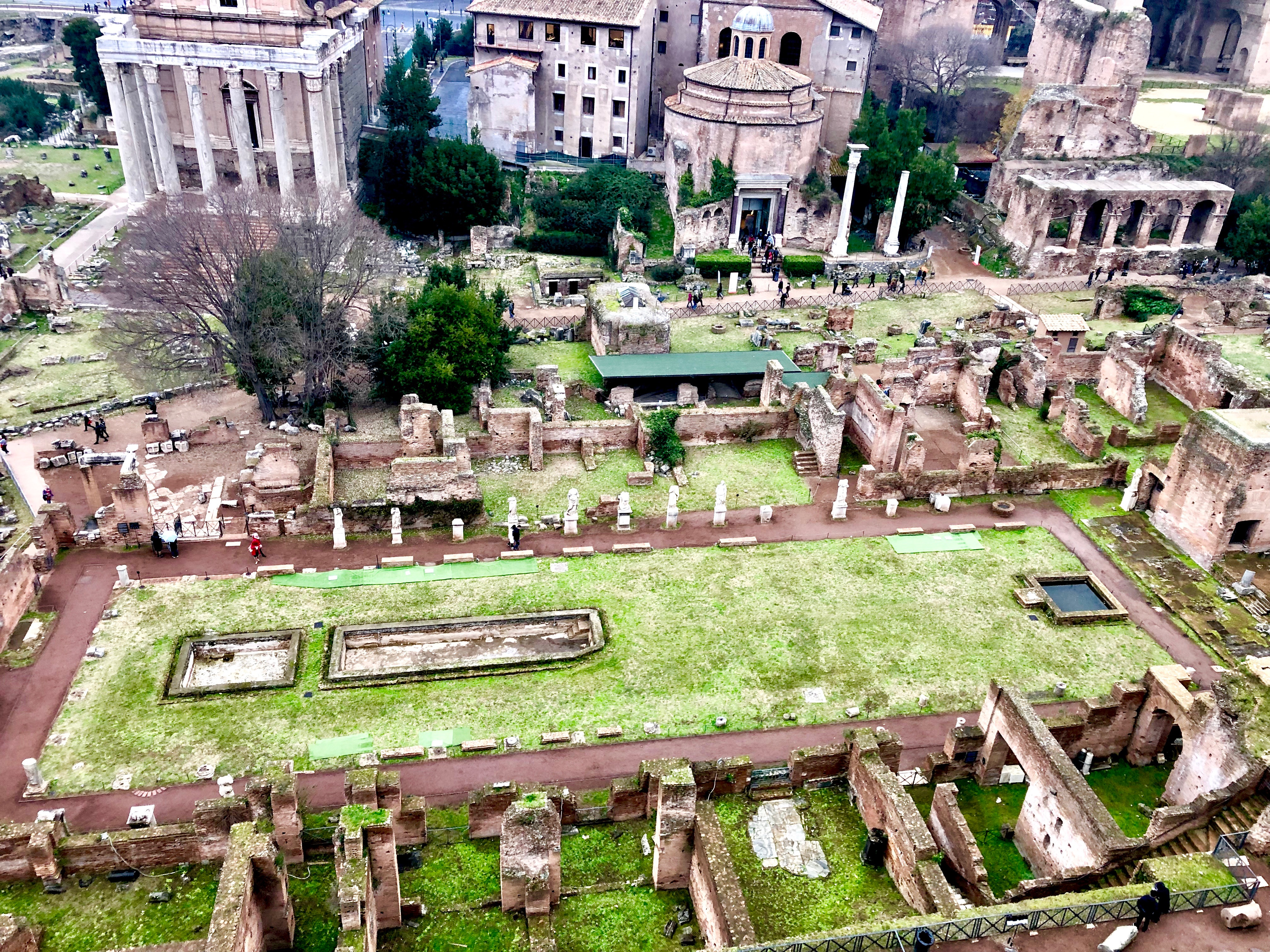
- House of the Vestals

- Shown within Augustan Rome
- Interactive map of House of the Vestal Virgins
- 41°53′29″N 12°29′12″E

The House of the Vestal Virgins (Latin: Atrium Vestae; Italian: Casa delle Vestali) was the residence of Vestal Virgins, located behind the circular Temple of Vesta at the eastern edge of the Roman Forum, between the Regia and the Palatine Hill. The domus publica, where the Pontifex Maximus dwelled, was located near the Atrium until that role was assumed by the emperors.

== Structure ==
The Atrium Vestae was a three-story 50-room palace in the ancient Roman Forum built around an elegant elongated atrium or court with a double pool. To the very east is an open vaulted hall with a statue of Numa Pompilius, the mythological founder of the cult.

The complex lay at the foot of the Palatine Hill, where a sacred grove that was slowly encroached upon lingered into Imperial times, when all was swept away by the Great Fire of Rome in 64. The House of the Vestals was rebuilt several times in the course of the Empire. After the dissolution of the College of the Vestals in the late 4th century AD, the House of the Vestals continued to serve as a residence building. It now housed officials of the imperial court, and subsequently the papal court. Archaeological finds from this period include a hoard of 397 gold coins from the 5th century and another 830 Anglo-Saxon coins dating from the 9th and 10th centuries. The site was abandoned in the 11th/12th century.

Today, remains of the statues of the Vestals can be seen in the Atrium Vestae.

== Gallery ==
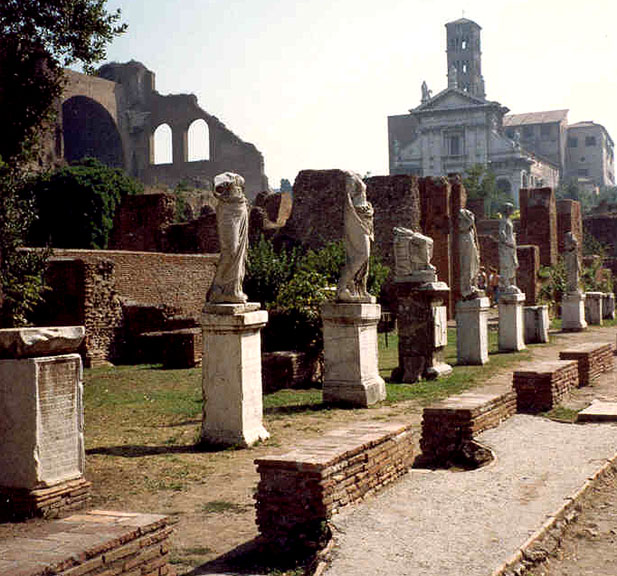
Statues at the House of the Vestals

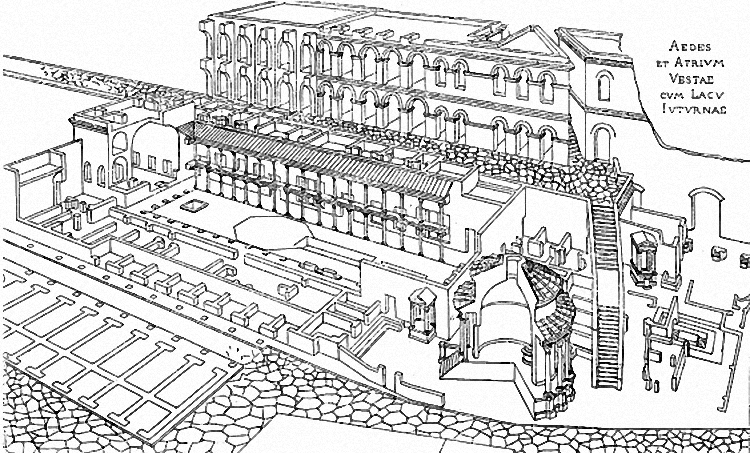
A reconstruction of the House of the Vestals by Christian Huelsen (1905)

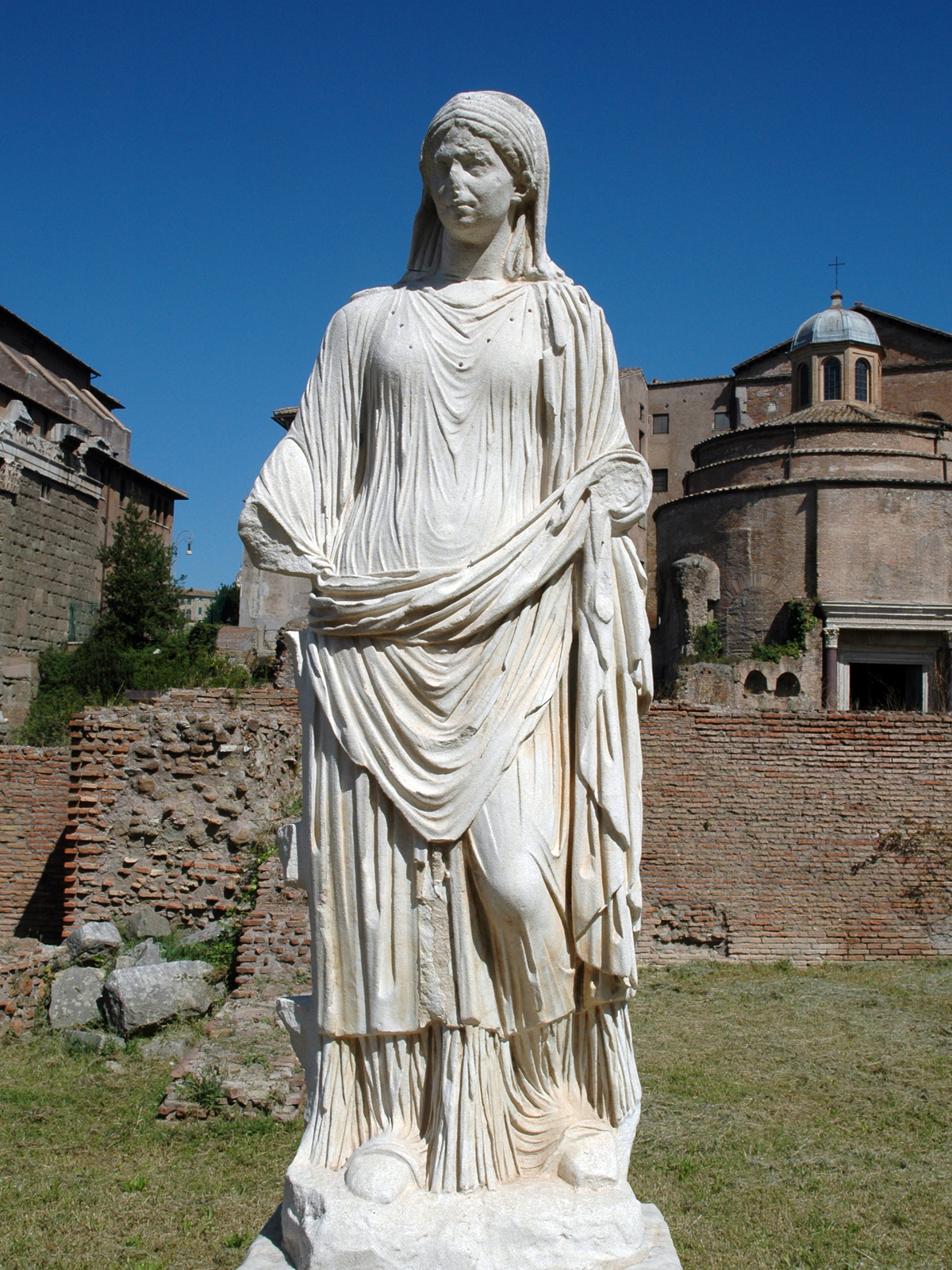
Roman sculpture, House of the Vestals, Forum Romanum

== Notes ==
Preceded by Temple of Vesta	Landmarks of Rome; House of the Vestals	Succeeded by Largo di Torre Argentina
