= Via Sacra =

Street of ancient Rome

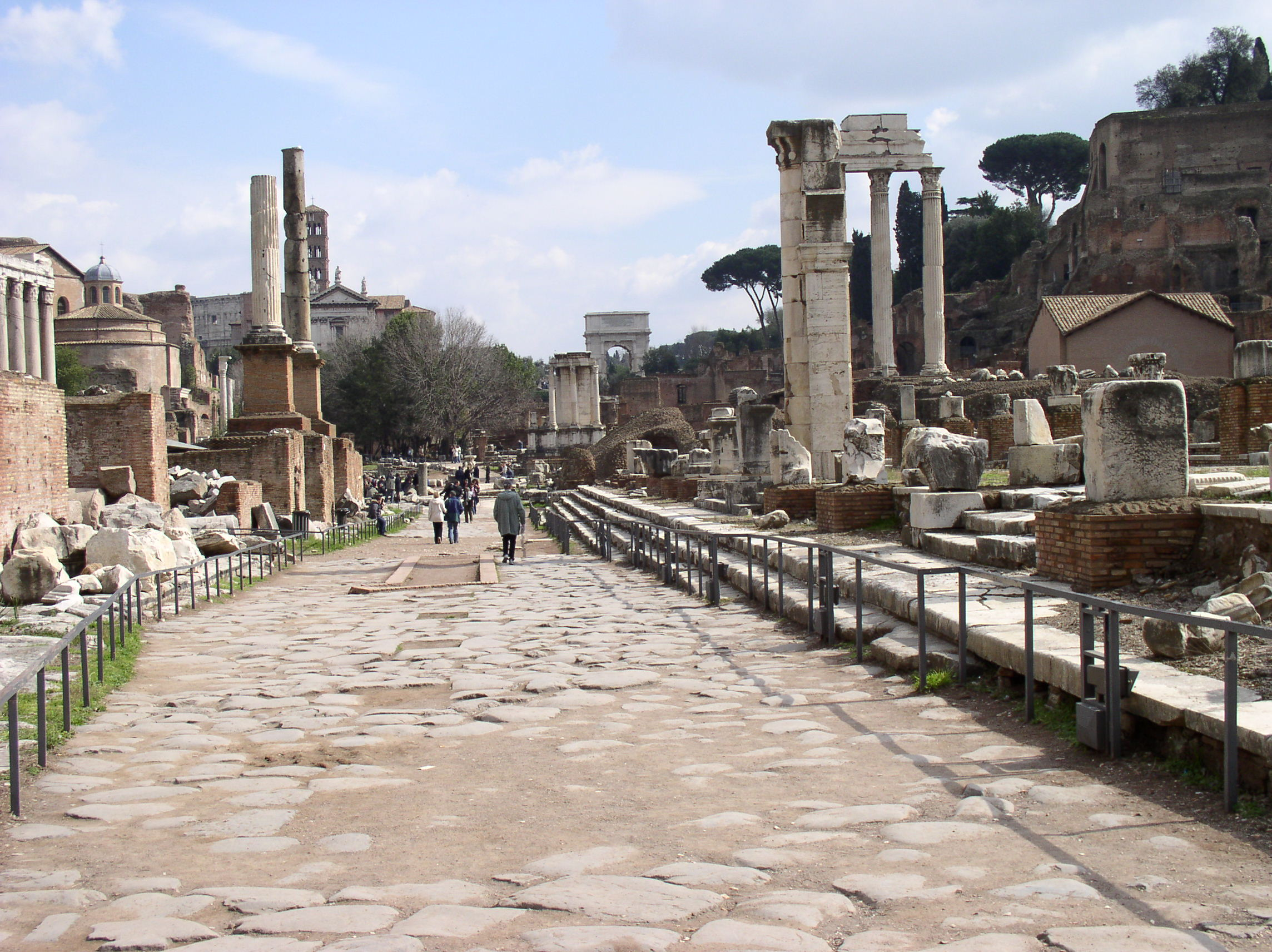
- Via Sacra passing through the Forum, with the Basilica Julia on the right

- Shown within Augustan Rome
- Interactive map of Via Sacra
- 41°53′N 12°29′E
- Location: Rome, Italy

The Via Sacra (Latin: Sacra Via, "Sacred Street") was the main street of ancient Rome, leading from the top of the Capitoline Hill, through some of the most important religious sites of the Forum (where it is the widest street), to the Colosseum.

The road was part of the traditional route of the Roman triumph that began on the outskirts of the city and proceeded through the Roman Forum. Later it was paved. During the reign of Nero, it was lined with colonnades.

The road provided the setting for many deeds and misdeeds of Rome's history, the solemn religious festivals, the magnificent triumphs of victorious generals, and the daily throng assembling in the Basilicas to chat, throw dice, engage in business, or secure justice. Many prostitutes lined the street as well, looking for potential customers. From the reign of Augustus, the Via Sacra played a role in the Apotheosis ceremony by which deceased Roman emperors were formally deified. The body of the emperor, concealed under a wax death mask, was carried on a pall from the Palatine hill down the Via Sacra into the Forum, where funeral orations were held before the procession of knights and senators resumed its course to the Campus Martius.

== Course ==
While the western stretch of the Via Sacra which runs through the Forum follows the original ancient route of the road, the eastern stretch between the end of the forum and the Colosseum, which passes underneath the Arch of Titus, is a redirection of the road built after the Great Fire of Rome in AD 64. In the Republic and Early Empire, the route forked to the north near the House of the Vestals and passed through a saddle in the Velian Hill, now occupied largely by the Basilica of Maxentius and the modern Via dei Fori Imperiali. As part of his rebuilding program following the fire, Nero essentially straightened the road by redirecting it between the Velian and Palatine Hills, creating grand colonnades on either side for shop stalls and commerce. At the east side was built under Hadrian and Antoninus Pius the temple of Venus and Roma.

== Sources ==
- Filippo Coarelli (2014). Rome and Environs. University of California Press. pp. 81–82.
- L. Richardson, jr (October 1992). A New Topographical Dictionary of Ancient Rome: Sacra Via. JHU Press. ISBN 9780801843006.

Preceded by Via dei Fori Imperiali	Landmarks of Rome; Via Sacra	Succeeded by Via Veneto
