= List of monuments of the Roman Forum =

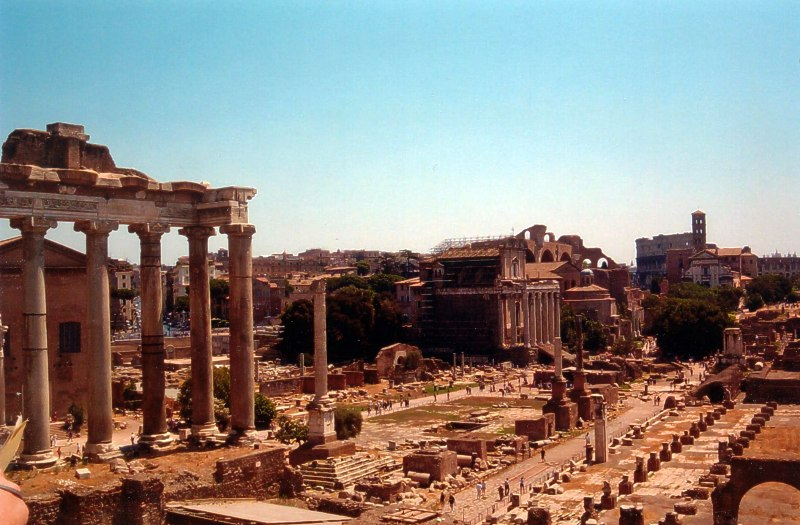
A view of the Roman Forum, looking east.

This list of monuments of the Roman Forum (Forum Romanum) includes existing and former buildings, memorials and other built structures in the famous Roman public plaza during its 1,400 years of active use (8th century BC–ca 600 AD). It is divided into three categories: those ancient structures that can be seen today as ruins or reconstructions, ancient structures that have vanished or exist only as fragments, and churches of the later, Christian, era.

Many of the Forum's monuments were originally built in the periods of the Roman Kingdom (753 BC–509 BC) and the Roman Republic (509 BC–27 BC), although most were destroyed and rebuilt several times. The existing ruins generally date from the Roman Empire (27 BC–476 AD).

== Existing (or reconstructed) ruins ==
=== Temples ===
- Temple of Castor and Pollux (494 BC)
- Temple of Saturn (501 BC)
- Temple of Vesta (7th century BC)
- Temple of Venus and Roma (135)
- Temple of Antoninus and Faustina (141)
- Temple of Caesar (29 BC)
- Temple of Vespasian and Titus (79)
- Temple of Romulus (309)

=== Basilicas ===
- Basilica Aemilia
- Basilica Julia
- Basilica of Maxentius and Constantine
  - Colossus of Constantine, colossal statue formerly in the west apse of the Basilica of Maxentius

=== Arches ===
- Arch of Septimius Severus
- Arch of Titus
- Arch of Constantine

=== Government buildings or official residences ===
- Regia, originally the residence of the kings of Rome or at least their main headquarters, and later the office of the Pontifex Maximus, the high priest of Roman religion.
- Curia Julia, official meeting place of the Roman Senate (built by Julius Caesar, 44 BC; later reconstruction by Diocletian, 305 AD)
- Tabularium, the records office of Rome; inside is the Tabularium Museum
- Portico Dii Consentes ("Portico of the Harmonious Gods")
- Atrium Vestae, the house of the Vestal Virgins.
- Tullianum, the prison used to hold various foreign leaders and generals.

=== Smaller monuments ===
- Rostra (New Rostra, Rostra Augusti), platform from which politicians made their speeches to the Roman citizens
- Umbilicus urbis Romae, the designated centre ("navel") of the city from which, and to which, all distances in Rome and the Roman Empire were measured (probably identical with the Mundus Cereris)
- Milliarium Aureum After Augustus erected this monument, all roads were considered to begin here and all distances in the Roman Empire were measured relative to that point.
- Column of Phocas, the last monument built within the Forum.
- Lapis Niger ("Black Stone"), a very ancient shrine which was obscure even to the Romans.
- Plutei of Trajan (Plutei Traiani), now in the Curia Julia

=== Pools, springs ===
- The Lacus Curtius, the site of a mysterious pool venerated by Romans even after they had forgotten what it signified.
- The Lacus Iuturnae ("Spring of Juturna"), a healing pool where Castor and Pollux were said to have watered their horses

=== Roads, streets, staircases ===
- Gemonian stairssteps situated in the central part of Rome, leading from the Arx of the Capitoline Hill down to the Roman Forum.
- Clivus Capitolinus was the street that started at the Arch of Tiberius, wound around the Temple of Saturn, and ended at Capitoline Hill.
- Via Sacra, the famous processional street of Roman Triumphs; linked the Atrium Vestae with the Colosseum.
- Vicus Jugarius ("Street of the Yoke-Makers")

== Vanished (or almost vanished) structures ==
=== Associated with the old Comitium ===
- Curia Hostilia (c. 560 BC-c. 80 BC), original meeting place of the Senate (replaced by the Curia Cornelia)
- Basilica Porcia (184 BC), first basilica in the Forum area; built by Marcus Portius Cato (Cato the Elder)
- Curia Cornelia (c. 80 BC-c. 50 BC), subsequent meeting place of the Senate (replaced by the Curia Julia)
- Rostra Vetera (Old Rostra), main speaker's platform until it was replaced by the nearby Rostra Augusta (New Rostra)
- Graecostasis, platform or "grandstand" for Greek and other foreign ambassadors
- Statue of Attus Navius and the Ficus Navia (Navian fig tree), in front of the Curia Hostilia (the well-being of Rome was supposed to be dependent upon the health of this sacred fig-tree)
- Columna Maenia ("Column of Maenius"), a commemorative column celebrating the (second) Battle of Antium (338 BC)
- Columna Rostrata C. Duilii ("Rostral Column of Gaius Duilius"), a commemorative column celebrating the naval Battle of Mylae (260 BC); remnants of the inscription are in the Capitoline Museum

=== Elsewhere in the Forum ===
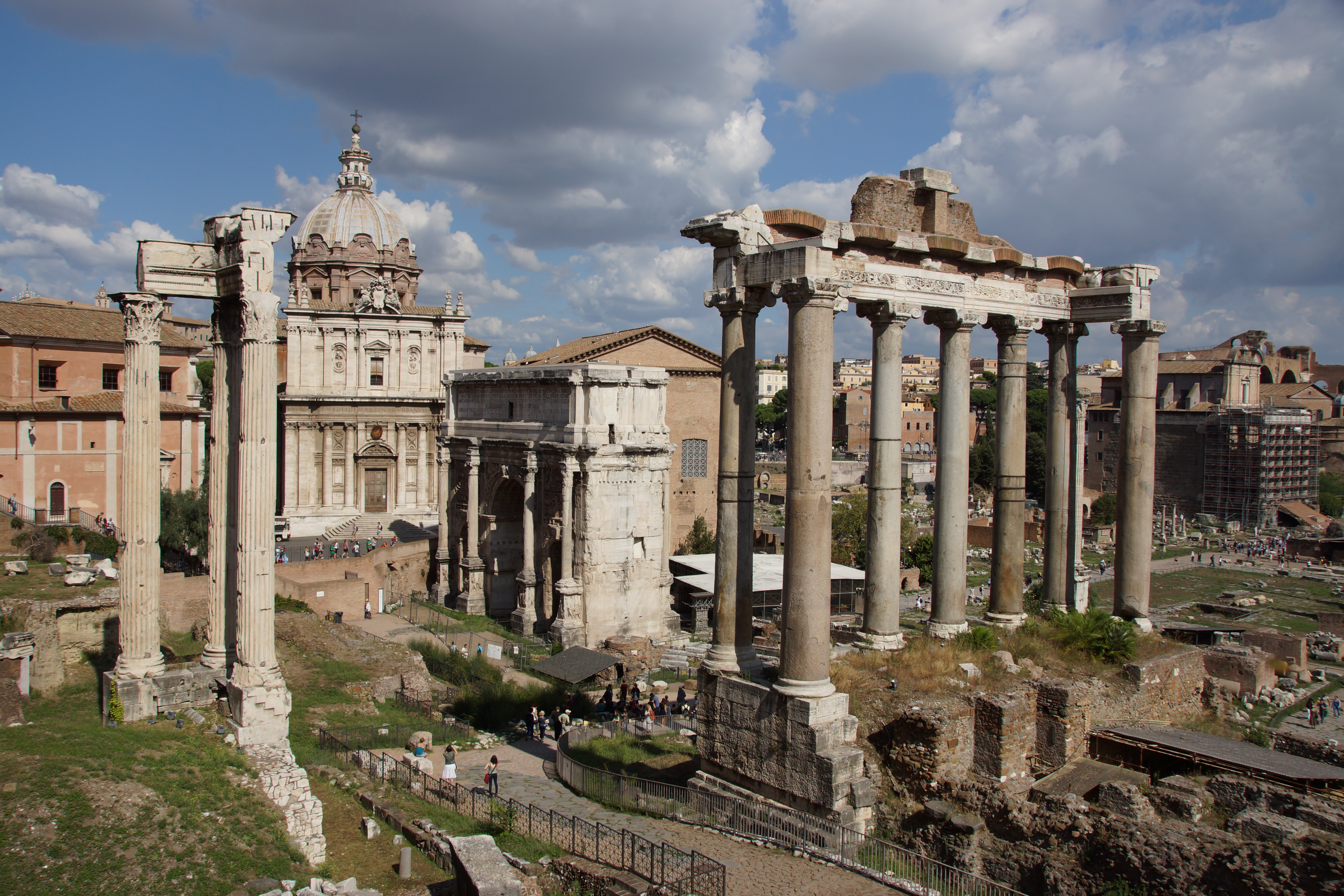
The Temple of Saturn, Arch of Septimius Severus, and Temple of Vespasian and Titus

- Altar of Saturn (Ara Saturni), much older than the associated Temple of Saturn
- Arch of Augustus (29 BC), commemorated the Battle of Actium (31 BC)
- Arch of Fabius (Fornix Fabianus; 121 BC), earliest triumphal arch in the Forum
- Arch of Tiberius (16 AD)
- Basilica Fulvia (179 BC), replaced by the Basilica Aemilia in 78 BC
- Basilica Paulli
- Basilica Opimia
- Basilica Sempronia (170 BC), replaced by the Basilica Julia in 46 BC
- "Ficus, Olea, Vitus", a small garden plot in the center of the Forum plaza where a fig-tree, olive-tree and grape-vine were cultivated; beside (or in) the Lacus Curtius
- Domus Aurea ("Golden House" of Nero), part of its porticoed entrance extended into the eastern Forum
- Domus Publica ("State House"), official residence of the Pontifex Maximus near the Regia
- Office of the Scribes and Heralds of the Aediles
- Pool of Servilius (Lacus Servilius), near the Basilica Julia; Sulla displayed heads of executed Senators there
- Rostra Diocletiani, in front of the Temple of Caesar; on the opposite side of the Forum from the Rostra Augusti
- Shrine of Faustina the Younger
- Shrine of Vulcan (Vulcanal)
- Shrine of Venus Cloacina (Sacellum Cloacinae)
- Statua Marsyae ("Statue of Marsyas"), the satyr depicted with wineskin over his left shoulder and raising his right arm; a symbol of liberty
- Statue of Constantine the Great
- Statue of Domitian
- Statue of Tremulus
- Statue of Vertumnus
- Temple of Augustus
- Temple of Bacchus
- Temple of Concord
- Temple of Janus
- Temple of Jupiter Stator, either on the Forum or on the Palatine Hill
- Tribunal Aurelium (Tribunal of Aurelius), near the Temple of Castor and Pollux
- Tribunal of the City Praetor (Praetor Urbanus)
- Tribunal of the Praetor for Foreigners (Praetor Peregrinus)
- Well-head of Libo (Puteal Libonus or Puteal Scribonianum)
- Statues of numerous other gods and men

== Christian churches ==
- S. Maria Antiqua (6th century), oldest Christian monument in the Forum
  - Oratory of the Forty Martyrs (6th or 7th century), attached to S. Maria Antiqua
- SS. Cosmas and Damian (527), inside the "Temple of Romulus"
- SS. Martina e Luca (625; current facade 1635-69)
- SS. Sergio e Bacco (678; totally demolished by 1812)
- S. Lorenzo de’ Speziali in Miranda (7th century; current facade 1602), inside the Temple of Antoninus and Faustina
- S. Adriano (7th century; baroque interior removed, 1935–38), formerly inside the Curia Julia
- S. Francesca Romana (10th century; current facade 1615), or Sta. Maria Nuova
- S. Maria Liberatrice (13th century; New facade 1617; Demolished 1900)
- S. Giuseppe dei Falegnami (1540)
