= Curia Cornelia =

Curia in the Roman Forum

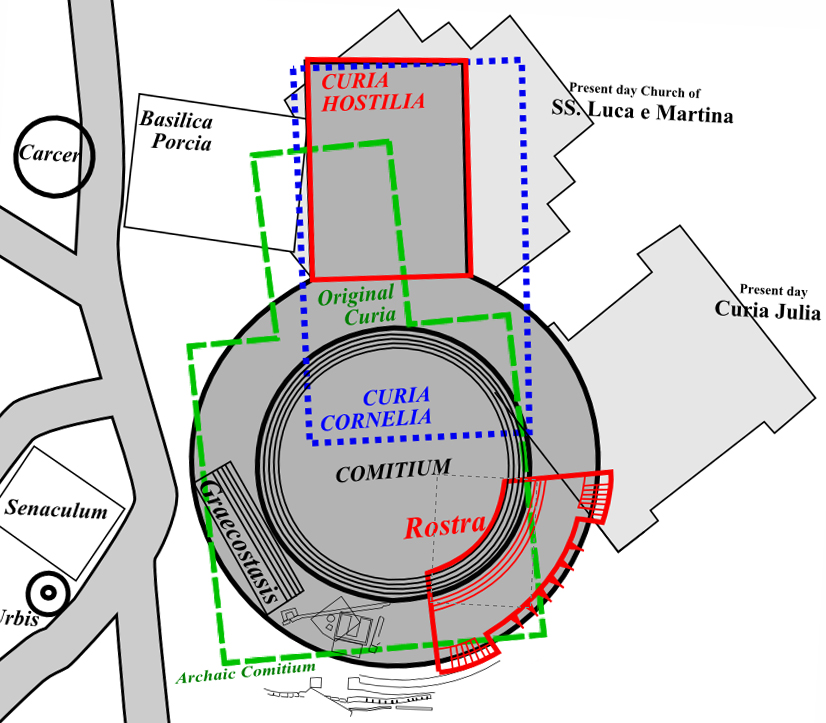
The Comitium in green, the Curia Hostilia and Rostra both built by Tullus Hostilius in red, and the Curia Cornelia, built by Lucius Cornelius Sulla in blue.

The Curia Cornelia was a place where the Roman Senate assembled beginning c. 52 BC. It was the largest of all the Curiae (Senate Houses) built in Rome. Its construction took over a great deal of the traditional comitium space and brought the senate building into a commanding location within the Roman Forum as a whole. It was the Senate House of the time of Julius Caesar and is significant because its location was moved by him to diminish the Senate's dominance within the City and Republic.

== History ==
In 80 BC, Lucius Cornelius Sulla decided to enlarge the existing Curia to accommodate the doubling of senators in the Republic. He had to demolish the old Curia Hostilia and the Comitium, but the name Hostilia was kept.

The Curia Hostilia was again destroyed during riots at the funeral of Publius Clodius Pulcher, in 52 BC. It was rebuilt again by Faustus Cornelius Sulla, the son of Lucius Cornelius Sulla, and took the name Curia Cornelia.

In 44 BC, the Curia was converted into a temple by Caesar during his redesign of the Roman Forum. It is not known when the building was finally torn down, but its location in relation to the Forum of Caesar made it more than likely that happened during or after the construction of the first Imperial Forum.

Finally, Caesar replaced the Curia Cornelia with the Curia Julia, which still stands, in 44 BC.

== See also ==
- Cicero
- Curia Hostilia
- Curia Julia
- Curia of Pompey
- Graecostasis
- Lapis Niger
- Roman Forum
- List of monuments of the Roman Forum
- Rostra
