= Columna Maenia =

Coordinates: 41.8930°N 12.4846°E

The Columna Maenia was an honorary column erected in the Comitium of the Roman Republic by Gaius Maenius in 338 BC for his victory over the Latins at the Battle of Antium. Gaius Maenius also adorned the Rostra, with the naval rams (rostra in Latin) of six ships from the Antiate fleet confiscated by Rome. The column was beside the Rostra and the Graecostasis. Some historians believe the column to be from the atrium of Gaius Maenius's home which was sold to Cato and Flaccus as mentioned by Pseudo-Asconius (Caec. 50).

The column was used as part of an elaborate timing device which determined the final hour of the day when the sun was viewed from the Curia Hostilia passing the column, moving towards the Carcer. Pliny states that the accensus consulum announced the supremam horam, the time when the sun had moved downward from the Columna Maenia to the Carcer. This was done from the same location as the call for midday, the Curia. The column was south of the place of observation or on a line which passed from the Rostra and Graecostasis.

Various petty criminals were bound to the column as a form of public punishment.
