= Lapis Niger =

Ancient shrine at the Forum Romanum

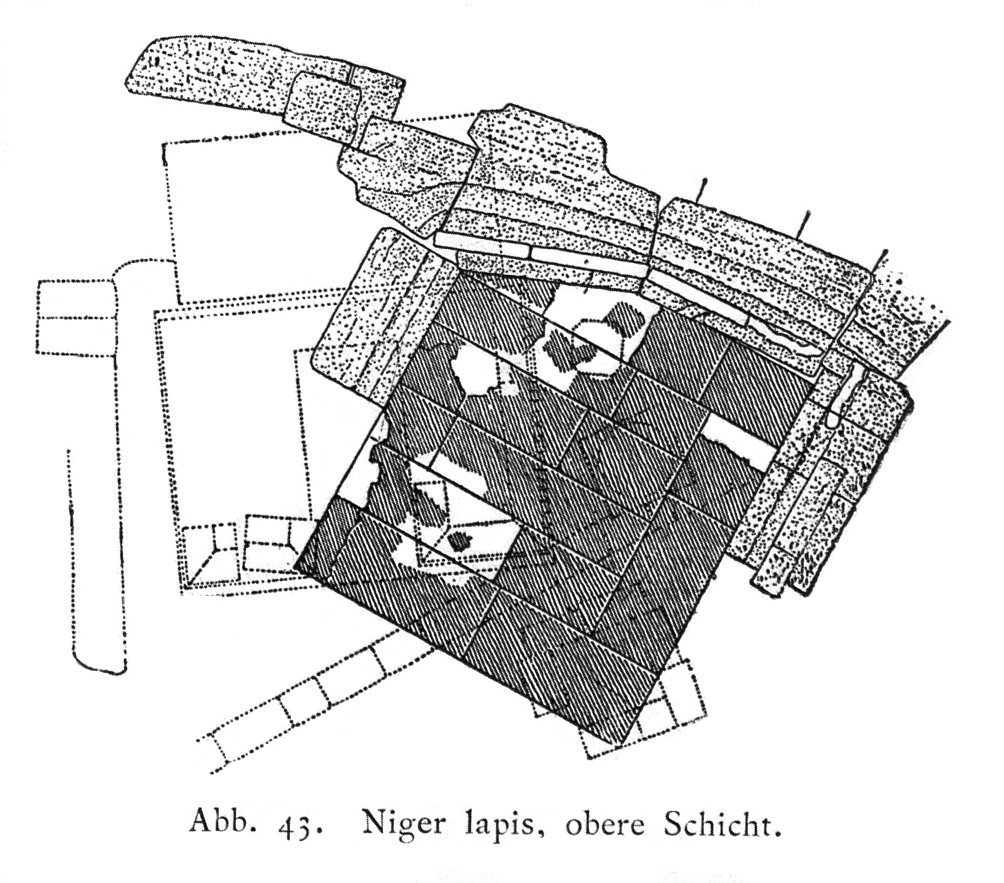

- Location within Rome
- 41°53′33″N 12°29′5″E
- Type: Shrine
- Location: Regione VIII Forum Romanum

History
- Built: 5th century BC
- Built by: Tullus Hostilius

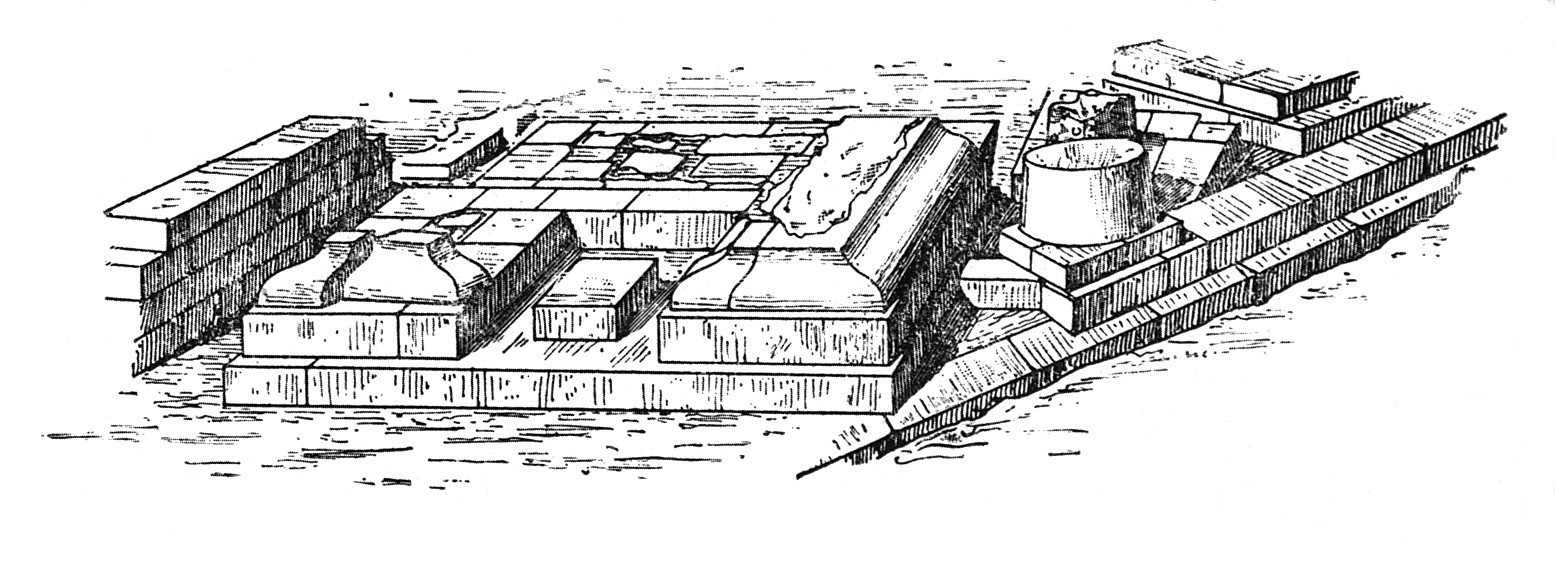
Drawing (1906) of the excavated Lapis Niger in the Roman Forum, in Rome, Italy. Visible are the sacellum (miniature shrine; left), the truncated tufa column (right) and the rectangular stele with inscriptions (behind column stub).

The Lapis Niger (Latin, "Black Stone") is an ancient shrine in the Roman Forum. Together with the associated Vulcanal (a sanctuary to Vulcan) it constitutes the only surviving remnants of the old Comitium, an early assembly area that preceded the Forum and is thought to derive from an archaic cult site of the 7th or 8th century BC.

The black marble paving (1st century BC) and modern concrete enclosure (early 20th century) of the Lapis Niger overlie an ancient altar and a stone block with one of the earliest known Old Latin inscriptions (c. 570–550 BC). The superstructure monument and shrine may have been built by Julius Caesar during his reorganization of the Forum and Comitium space. Alternatively, this may have been done a generation earlier by Sulla during one of his construction projects around the Curia Hostilia. The site was rediscovered and excavated from 1899 to 1905 by Italian archaeologist Giacomo Boni.

Mentioned in many ancient descriptions of the Forum dating back to the Roman Republic and the early days of the Roman Empire, the significance of the Lapis Niger shrine was obscure and mysterious to later Romans, but it was always discussed as a place of great sacredness and significance. It is constructed on top of a sacred spot consisting of much older artifacts found about 5 ft (1.5 m) below the present ground level. The name "black stone" may have originally referred to the black stone block (one of the earliest known Latin inscriptions) or it may refer to the later black marble paving at the surface. Located in the Comitium in front of the Curia Julia, this structure survived for centuries due to a combination of reverential treatment and overbuilding during the era of the early Roman Empire.

== History ==
The site is believed to date back to the Roman regal period. The inscription includes the word rex, probably referring to either a king (rex), or to the rex sacrorum, a high religious official. At some point, the Romans forgot the original significance of the shrine. This led to several conflicting stories of its origin. Romans believed the Lapis Niger marked either the grave of the first king of Rome, Romulus, or the spot where he was murdered by the Senate; the grave of Hostus Hostilius, grandfather of King Tullus Hostilius; or the location where Faustulus, foster father of Romulus, fell in battle.

The earliest writings referring to this spot regard it as a suggestum where the early kings of Rome would speak to the crowds at the forum and to the Senate. The two altars are common at shrines throughout the early Roman or late Etruscan period.

The Lapis Niger is mentioned in an uncertain and ambiguous way by several writers of the early Imperial period: Dionysius of Halicarnassus, Plutarch, and Festus. They do not seem to know which old stories about the shrine should be believed.

In November 2008 heavy rain damaged the concrete covering that had been protecting the Vulcanal and its monuments since the 1950s. This includes the inscribed stone block (the marble and cement covering is a mix of the original black marble said to have been used to cover the site by Sulla, and modern cement used to create the covering and keep the marble in place). An awning was placed to protect the ancient relics until the covering was repaired, allowing the public to view the original suggestum for the first time in 50 years. The nature of the coverings and repairs made it impossible to see the remains which were several meters underground.

== Description ==
=== The shrine ===
The Lapis Niger went through several incarnations. The initial versions were destroyed by fire or the sacking of the city and buried under the slabs of black marble. It is believed this was done by Sulla; however, it has also been argued that Julius Caesar may have buried the site during his re-alignment of the Comitium.

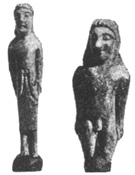
Dedicatory statues found at the Lapis Niger site

The original version of the site, first excavated in 1899, included a truncated cone of tuff (possibly a monument) and the lower portion of a square pillar (cippus) which was inscribed with an Old Latin inscription, perhaps the oldest in existence if not the Duenos inscription or the Praeneste fibula. A U-shaped altar, of which only the base still survives, was added some time later. In front of the altar are two bases, which may also have been added separately from the main altar. The antiquarian Verrius Flaccus (whose work is preserved only in the epitome of Pompeius Festus), a contemporary of Augustus, described a statue of a resting lion placed on each base, "just as they may be seen today guarding graves". This is sometimes referred to as the Vulcanal. Also added at another period was an honorary column, possibly with a statue topping it.

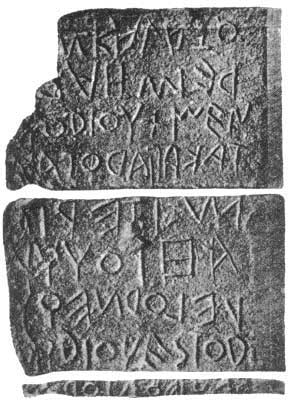
Lines 8 to 16 of the inscription.

Archaeological excavations (1899–1905) revealed various dedicatory items from vase fragments, statues and pieces of animal sacrifices around at the site in a layer of deliberately placed gravel. All these artifacts date from very ancient Rome, between the 5th and 7th centuries BC.

The second version, placed when the first version was demolished in the 1st century BC to make way for further development in the forum, is a far simpler shrine. A pavement of black marble was laid over the original site and was surrounded by a low white wall or parapet. The new shrine lay just beside the Rostra, the senatorial speaking platform.

=== The inscription ===
The inscription on the stone block has various interesting features. The inscription is written boustrophedon. Many of the oldest Latin inscriptions are written in this style. The meaning of the inscription is difficult to discern as the beginning and end are missing and only one third to one half of each line survives. It appears, however, to mention a rex or king and to level grave curses at anyone who dares disturb a ritual.

Attempts have been made at interpreting the meaning of the surviving fragment by Johannes Stroux, Georges Dumézil and Robert E. A. Palmer.

Here is the reading of the inscription as given by Dumézil (on the right the reading by Arthur E. Gordon):

I a 1 quoiho...
b 2-3 sakros: es/ed:sord...
II a 4-5 ...iaias/recei: lo...
b 6-7 ...euam/quos: re...
III a 8-9 ...m: kalato/rem: ha....
b 10-11 ...od: io: uxmen/takapia: dotau...
IV a 12 ...m: i: te: r p e
b 13-14 ...m: quoiha/uelod: nequ...
c 15 ...od: iouestod/
V 16 loiuquiodpo

qvoiho[.]... (or qvoi hoi...)
sakros:es/ed:sord...
...[..]a[..]as/recei: ic (or io)
...evam/qvos: re...
...m:kalato/rem: hab (or hal)
...tod:iovxmen/ta: kapia:duo:tavr...
m: iter[..]...
...m:qvoiha/velod: neqv...
...[.]od:iovestod/
loivqviodqo...

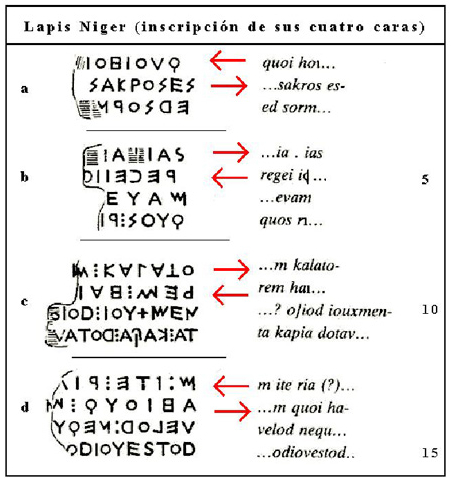
Diagram of the text

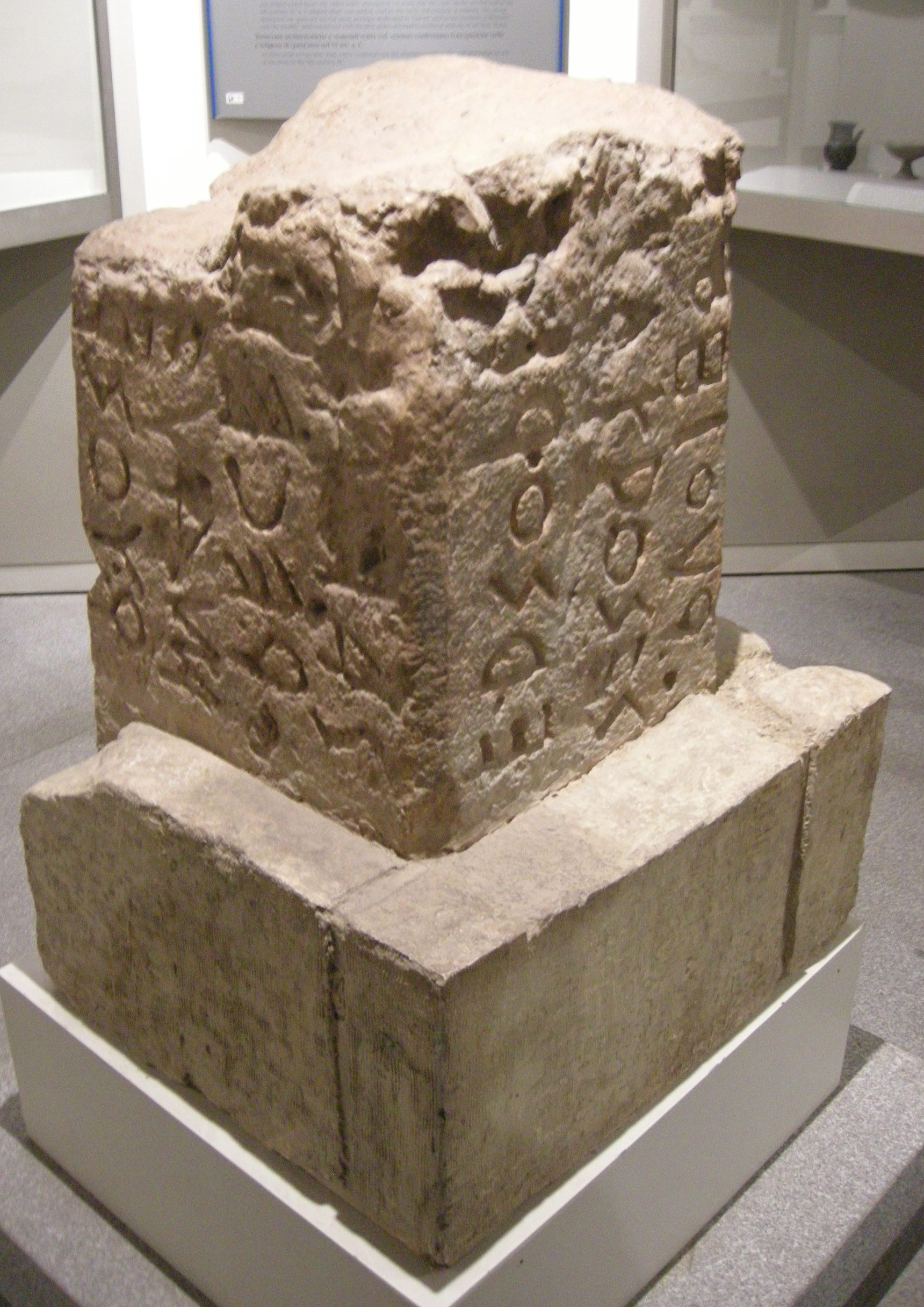
Reproduction of the Lapis Niger stone block with the inscription in Old Latin

(Roman numbers represent the four faces of the cippus (pedestal) plus the edge. Fragments on each face are marked with letters (a, b, c). Arabic numbers denote lines. A sign (/) marks the end of a line).

(The letters whose reading is uncertain or disputed are given in italics. The extension of the lacuna is uncertain: it may vary from 1/2 to 2/3 or even more. In Gordon's reading the v of duo in line 11 is read inscribed inside the o.)

Dumézil declined to interpret the first seven lines on the grounds that the inscription was too damaged, while acknowledging it was a prohibition under threat.

Dumézil's attempt is based on the assumption of a parallelism of some points of the fragmentary text inscribed on the monument and a passage of Cicero's De Divinatione (II 36. 77). In that passage, Cicero, discussing the precautions taken by augurs to avoid embarrassing auspices, states: "to this is similar what we augurs prescribe, in order to avoid the occurrence of the iuges auspicium, that they order to free from the yoke the animals (which are yoked)". 'They' here denotes the calatores, public slaves whom the augurs and other sacerdotes (priests) had at their service, and who, in the quoted passage, are to execute orders aimed at preventing profane people from spoiling and, by their inadvertent action thereby rendering void, the sacred operation. Even though impossible to connect meaningfully to the rest of the text, the mention of the rex in this context would be significant as at the time of the Roman monarchy, augury was considered as pertaining to the king: Cicero in the same treatise states: "Divination, as well as wisdom, was considered regal".

The iuges auspicium are defined thus by Paul the Deacon: "The iuges auspicium occur when an animal under the yoke makes its excrements".

Varro in explaining the meaning of the name of the Via Sacra, states that the augurs advanced along this street after leaving the arx used to inaugurate. While advancing along the Via Sacra they should avoid meeting a iuges auspicium. As the Via Sacra begins on the Capitol and stretches along the whole Forum, in the descent from the hill to the Forum the first crossing they met, i.e. the first place where the incident in question could happen, was named Vicus Jugarius: Dumézil thinks its name should be understood according to the prescription on issue. In fact the Comitium, where the cippus was found, is very close to the left side of this crossing. This fact would make it natural that the cippus were placed exactly there, as a warning to passers by of the possible occurrence of the order of the calatores.

In support of such an interpretation of the inscription, Dumézil emphasises the occurrence of the word recei (dative case of rex). Lines 8-9 could be read as: (the augur or the rex) [... iubet suu]m calatorem ha[ec *calare], lines 10–11 could be [... iug]ō (or [... subiugi]ō or [... iugari]ō) iumenta capiat, i.e.: "that he take the yoked animals from under the yoke" (with a separation prefix ex or de before the ablative as in Odyssea IX 416: "άπο μεν λίθον ειλε θυράων" = capere). Line 12 could be accordingly interpreted as: [... uti augur/ rex ad...-]m iter pe[rficiat].

The remaining lines could also be interpreted similarly, in Dumézil's view: iustum and liquidum are technical terms used as qualifying auspices, meaning regular, correctly taken and favourable. Moreover, the original form of classic Latin aluus, 'abdomen', and also stools, as still attested in Cato Maior was *aulos, that Max Niedermann on the grounds of Lithuanian reconstructs as * au(e)los. The h in quoihauelod could denote a hiatus as in ahēn(e)us, huhuic (i.e. bisyllable huic). Dumézil then proposes the following interpretation for lines 12–16: ... ne, descensa tunc iunctorum iumentoru]m cui aluo, nequ[eatur (religious operation under course in the passive infinitive) auspici]o iusto liquido. The hiatus marked by h in line 13 would require to read the antecedent word as quoii, dative of quoi: quoiei is the ancient dative of the accentuated relative pronoun, but one could suppose that in the enclitic indefinite pronoun the dative could have early been reduced to quoiī. The e in auelod can be an irrational vowel as in numerus from *nom-zo: cf. Etruscan Avile. As for loi(u)quod, it may be an archaic form of a type of which one can cite other instances, as lucidus and Lucius, fluuidus and flŭuius, liuidus and Līuius.

Michael Grant, in his book Roman Forum writes: "The inscription found beneath the black marble ... clearly represents a piece of ritual law ... the opening words are translatable as a warning that a man who damages, defiles or violates the spot will be cursed. One reconstruction of the text interprets it as referring to the misfortune which could be caused if two yoked draught cattle should happen while passing by to drop excrement simultaneously. The coincidence would be a perilous omen".

That the inscription may contain some laws of a very early period is also acknowledged by Allen C. Johnson.

Palmer instead, on the basis of a detailed analysis of every recognisable word, gave the following interpretation of this inscription, which he too considers to be a law:

Whosoever (will violate) this (grove), let him be cursed. (Let no one dump) refuse (nor throw a body ...). Let it be lawful for the king (to sacrifice a cow in atonement). (Let him fine) one (fine) for each (offence). Whom the king (will fine, let him give cows). (Let the king have a —) herald. (Let him yoke) a team, two heads, sterile… Along the route ... (Him) who (will) not (sacrifice) with a young animal .. in ... lawful assembly in grove...

== See also ==
- Curia Cornelia
- Curia of Pompey
- Duenos inscription
- Graecostasis
- List of monuments of the Roman Forum
