= Curia Julia =

Ancient Roman senate house

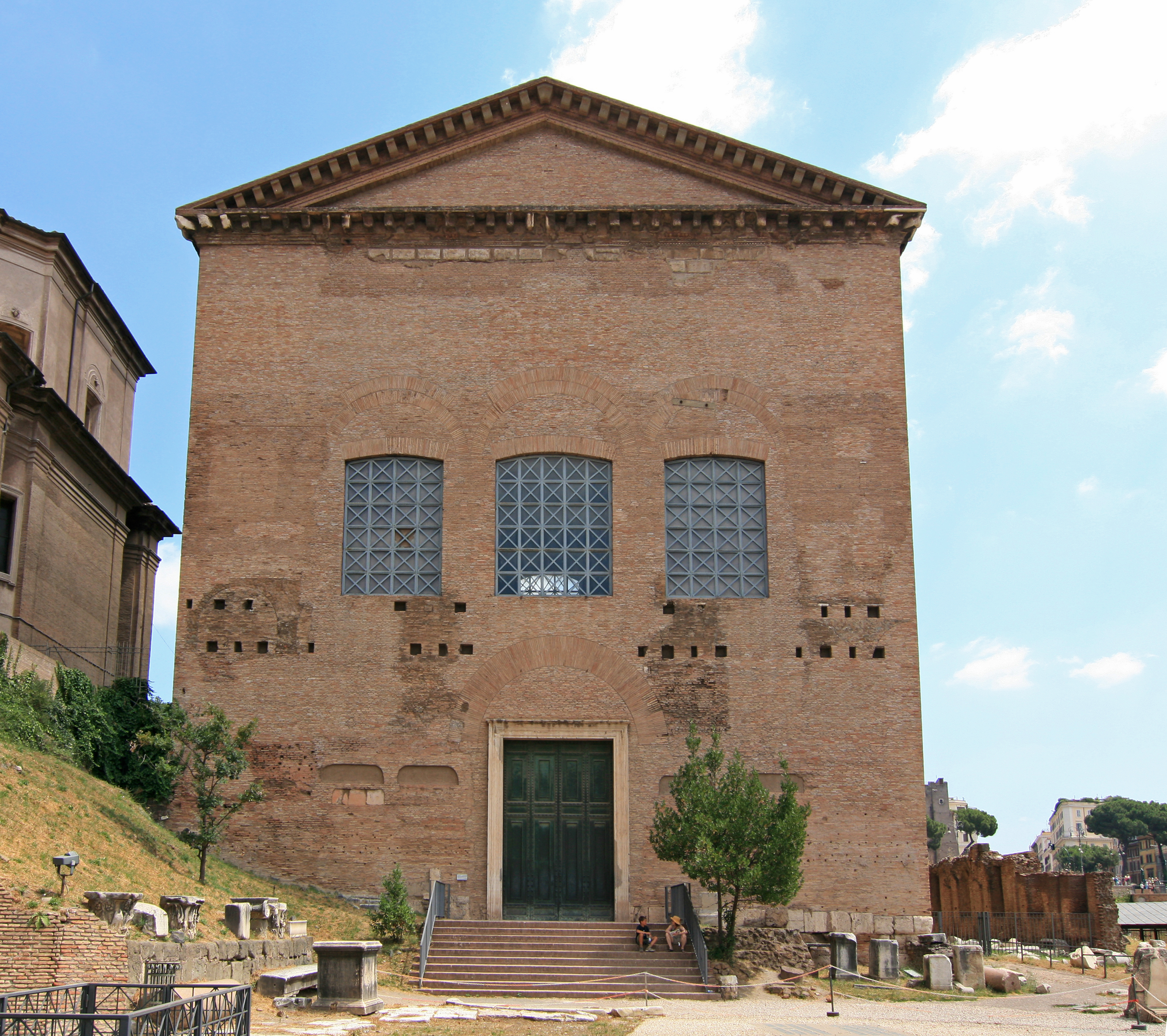
- The façade of the Curia Julia as it stands today

- Shown within Augustan Rome
- Interactive map of Curia Julia
- 41°53′34″N 12°29′07″E
- Type: Curia
- Location: Regio VIII Forum Romanum

History
- Built: 44–29 BC
- Built by: Julius Caesar

The Curia Julia (Latin: Curia Iulia) is the third named curia, or senate house, in the ancient city of Rome. It was built in 44 BC, when Julius Caesar replaced Faustus Cornelius Sulla's reconstructed Curia Cornelia, which had replaced the Curia Hostilia. Caesar did so to redesign both spaces within the Comitium and the Roman Forum. The alterations within the Comitium reduced the prominence of the Senate and cleared the original space.

The work was interrupted by Caesar's assassination at the Curia of Pompey of the Theatre of Pompey, where the Senate had been meeting temporarily while the work was completed. The project was eventually finished by Caesar's heir and successor, Augustus Caesar, in 29 BC.

The Curia Julia is one of a handful of Roman structures that survive mostly intact. This is due to its conversion into the basilica of Sant'Adriano al Foro in the 7th century and several later restorations. The roof, the upper elevations of the side walls and the rear façade are modern and date from the remodeling of the deconsecrated church, in the 1930s.

== History ==
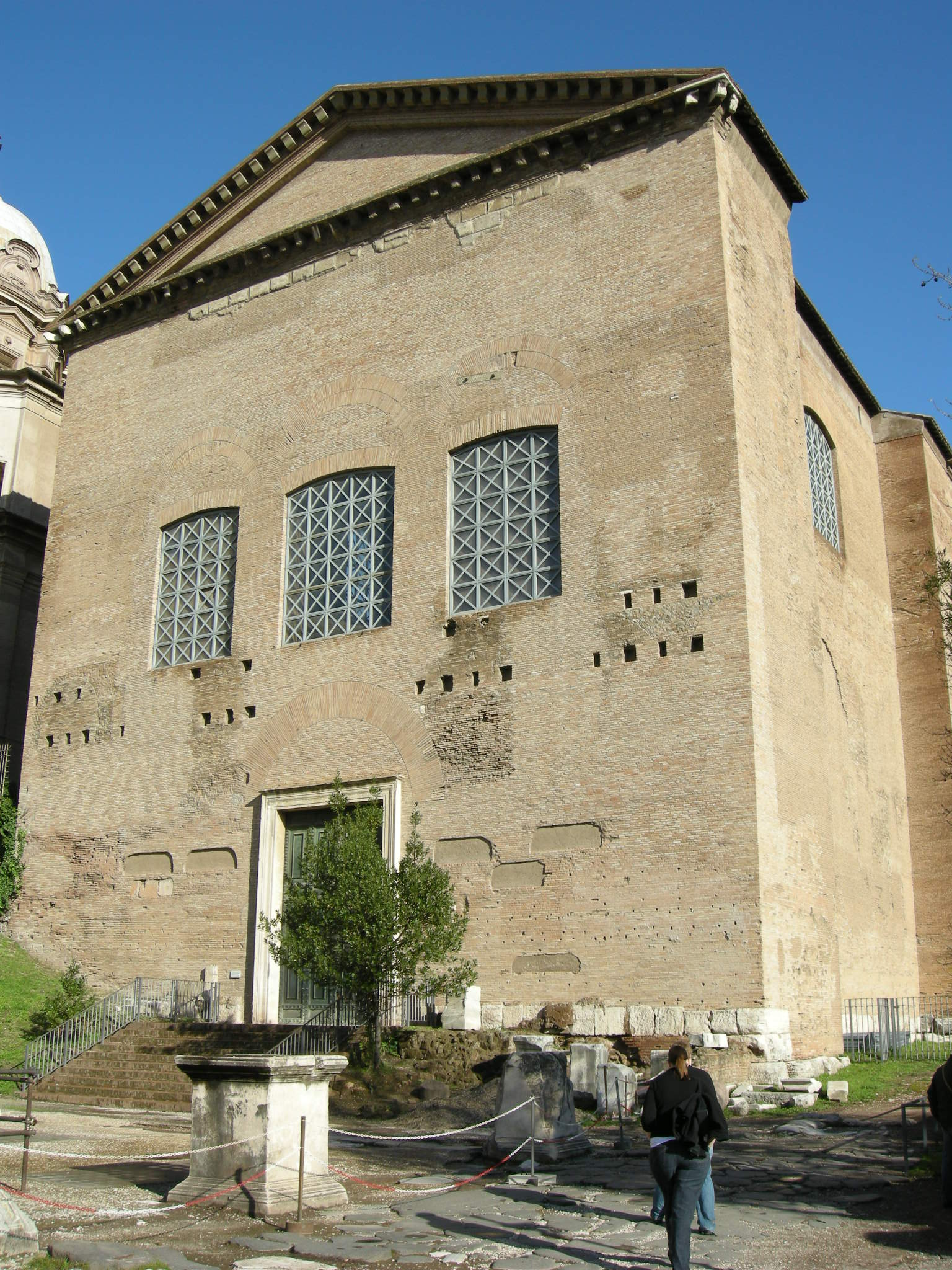
The Curia Julia in the Roman Forum, the seat of the imperial Senate

There were many curiae during the history of the Roman civilization, many of them existing at the same time. Curia means simply "meeting house". While the senate met regularly at the curia within the comitium space, there were many other structures designed for it to meet when the need occurred: for example, meeting with someone who was not allowed to enter the sanctified curiae of the Senate.

The Curia Julia is the third named curia within the comitium. Each structure was rebuilt a number of times but originated from a single Etruscan temple, built to honor the truce of the Sabine conflict. When this original temple was destroyed, Tullus Hostilius rebuilt it and gave it his name. It lasted for a few hundred years until the curia was destroyed by fire from the impromptu funeral of Publius Clodius Pulcher. A new structure was dedicated to its financial benefactor, Faustus Cornelius Sulla.

The structure now in the Forum is the second incarnation of Caesar's curia. In 94, the Curia Julia was restored under Domitian. In 283, it was heavily damaged by a fire, at the time of Emperor Carinus. From 284 to 305, the Curia was then rebuilt by Diocletian. It is the remnants of Diocletian's building that stands today. In 412, the Curia was restored again, this time by Urban Prefect Annius Eucharius Epiphanius.

In July 1923, the Italian government acquired the Curia Julia and the adjacent convent of the Church of S. Adriano from the Collegio di Spagna for approximately £16,000.

== Description ==
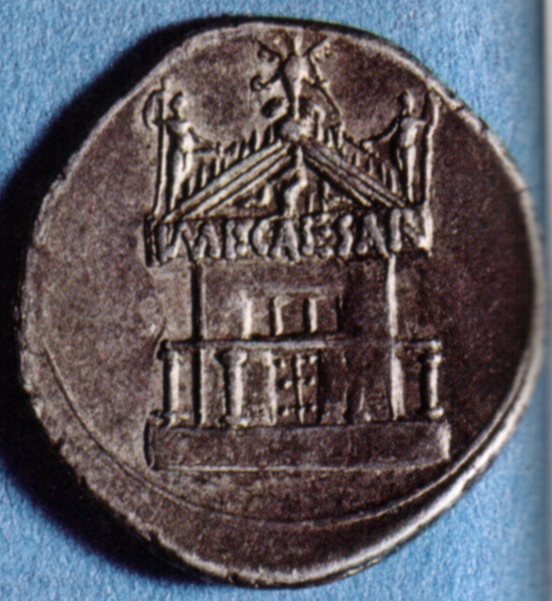
A denarius of Octavian showing the front of the Curia Julia

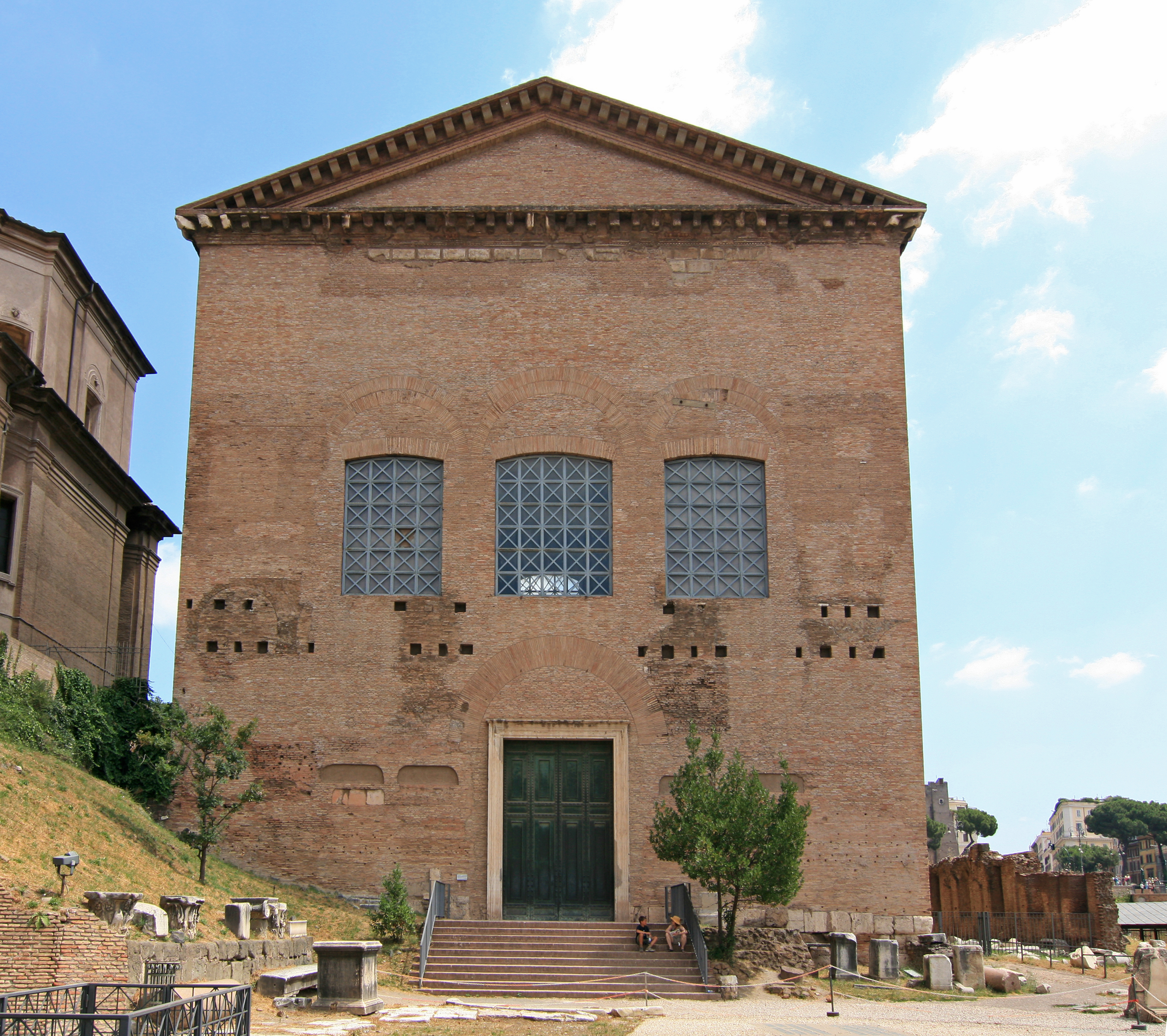
The front of the Curia Julia

The statue of Altar of Victory on a coin issued under Augustus, matching its description by Prudentius.

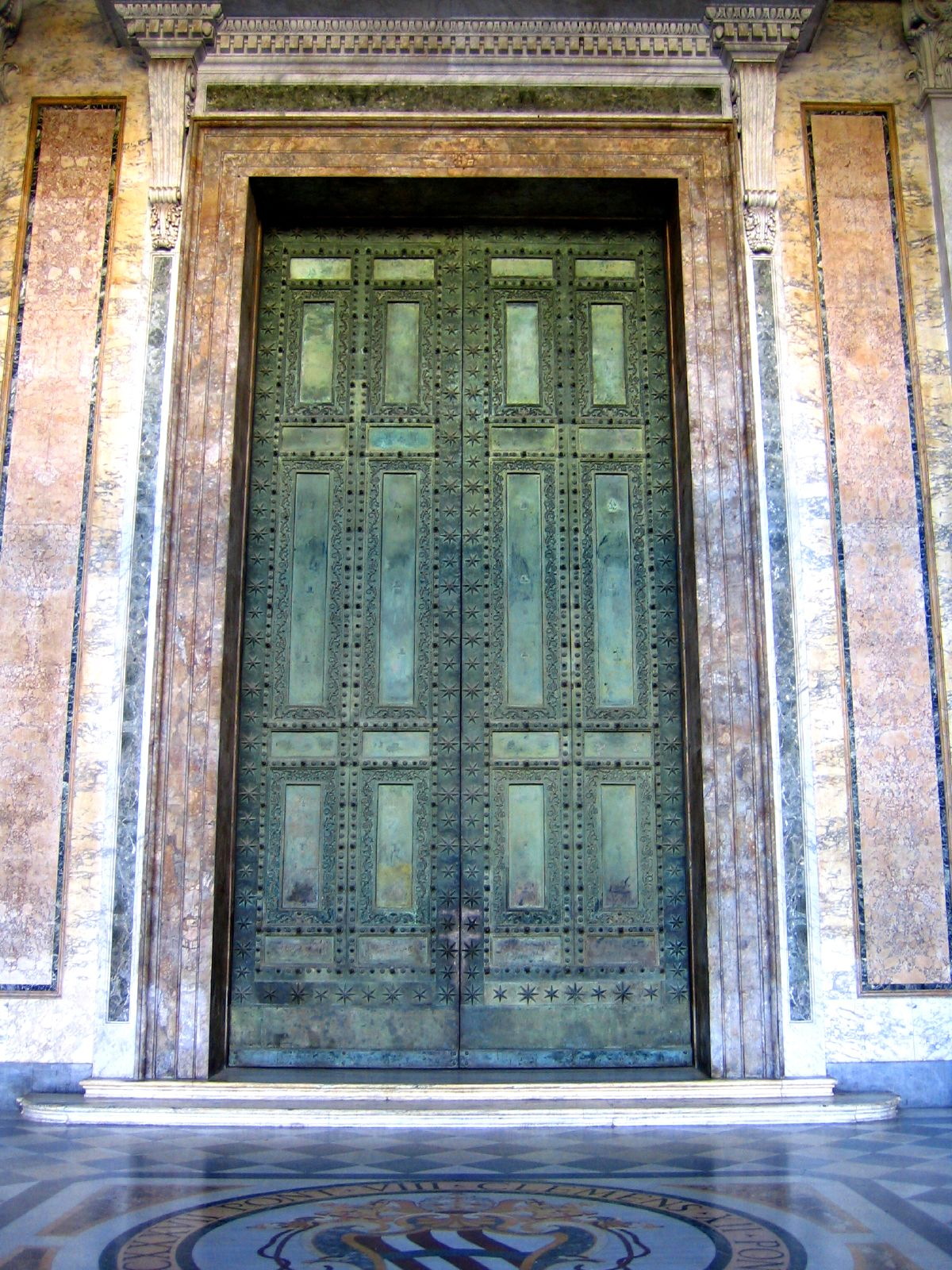
The ancient bronze doors of the Curia Julia, now in the Archbasilica of Saint John Lateran

The exterior of the Curia Julia features brick-faced concrete with a huge buttress at each angle. The lower part of the front wall was decorated with slabs of marble. The upper part was covered with stucco imitation of white marble blocks. A single flight of steps leads up to the bronze doors. The current bronze doors are modern replicas; the original bronze doors were transferred to the Basilica of St. John Lateran by Pope Alexander VII in 1660.

A coin was found within the doors during their transfer. That allowed archaeologists to date repairs made to the Senate House and the addition of the bronze doors to the reign of Emperor Domitian (AD 81–96). The original appearance of the Senate House is known from an Emperor Augustus Denarius of 28 BC, which shows the veranda held up by columns on the front wall of the building.

The interior of the Curia Julia is fairly austere. The hall is 25.2 m × 17.61 m (82.7 ft × 57.8 ft). There are three broad steps that could have fitted five rows of chairs or a total of about 300 senators. The walls are stripped but were originally veneered in marble two thirds of the way up. The two main features of the interior of the Curia Julia are its Altar of Victory and its striking floor.

At the far end of the hall could be found the "Altar of Victory". It consisted of a statue of Victoria, the personification of victory, standing on a globe, extending a wreath. The altar was placed in the Curia by Augustus to celebrate Rome's military prowess, more specifically his own victory at the Battle of Actium, in 31 BC. The altar was removed in 384 AD, as part of a general backlash against the pagan traditions of Ancient Rome after the rise of Christianity.

The other main feature of the Curia's interior, the floor, is in contrast to the building's colorless exterior. Featured on the floor is the Roman art technique of opus sectile in which materials are cut and inlaid into walls and floors to make pictures of patterns. That is described by Claridge as " stylized rosettes in squares alternate with opposed pairs of entwined cornucopias in rectangles, all worked in green and red porphyry on backgrounds of Numidian yellow Phrygian purple".

== Significance ==
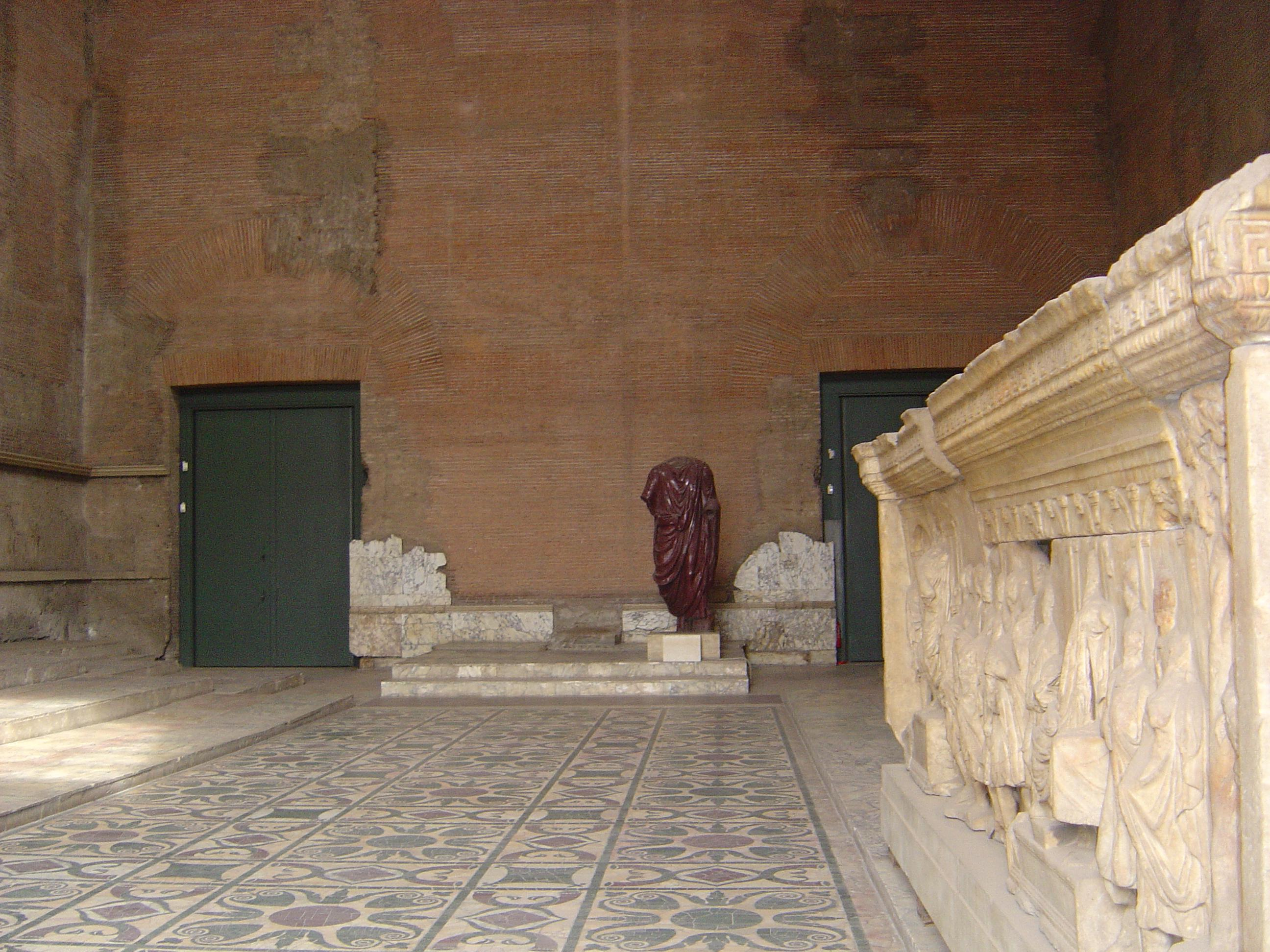
Inside the restored Curia Julia

In his Res Gestae Divi Augusti, Augustus writes of the project: "I built the Senate House... with the power of the state entirely in my hands by universal consent, I extinguished the flames of civil wars, and then relinquished my control, transferring the Republic back to the authority of the Senate and the Roman people. For this service I was named Augustus by a decree of the Senate". The relinquishment of power was truer in word than in deed; the construction of the Curia Julia coincided with the end of Republican Rome.

In the past, the Curia Hostilia and Comitium "were oriented by the cardinal points of the compass, which may have marked them out as specially augurated space and at any rate set them off obliquely from the Forum rectangle that formed over the centuries". Breaking with tradition, the Curia Julia was reoriented by Julius Caesar "on more 'rational' lines, squaring it up with the rectangular lines of the Forum and even more closely with his new forum, to which the new Senate House formed an architectural appendage more in keeping with the Senate's increasing subordination". The reduced power of the Roman Senate during the Imperial Period is reflected by the Curia Julia's less prominent location and orientation.

Still, the two buildings had similarities. Both the Curia Hostilia's Tabula Valeria and the Curia Julia's Altar of Victory in the Curia Julia, attest to the enduring preeminence of Rome's military despite the reduced role of the Senate.

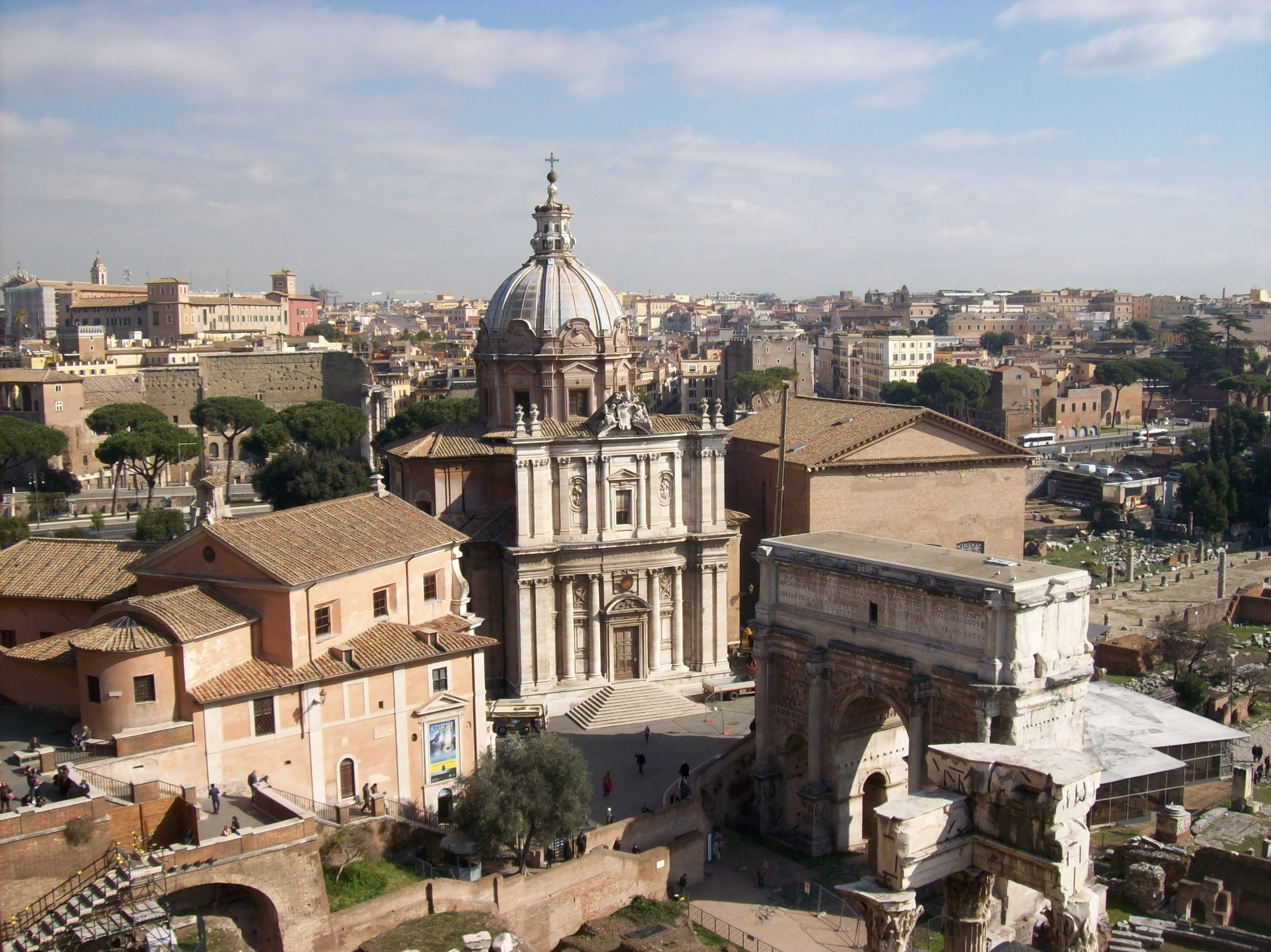
The Roman Forum seen from a window of the Palazzo Senatorio. At the centre is the church of St. Martina and Luca. At the lower right corner is the Arch of Septimius Severus, with the Curia partially visible behind the Arch

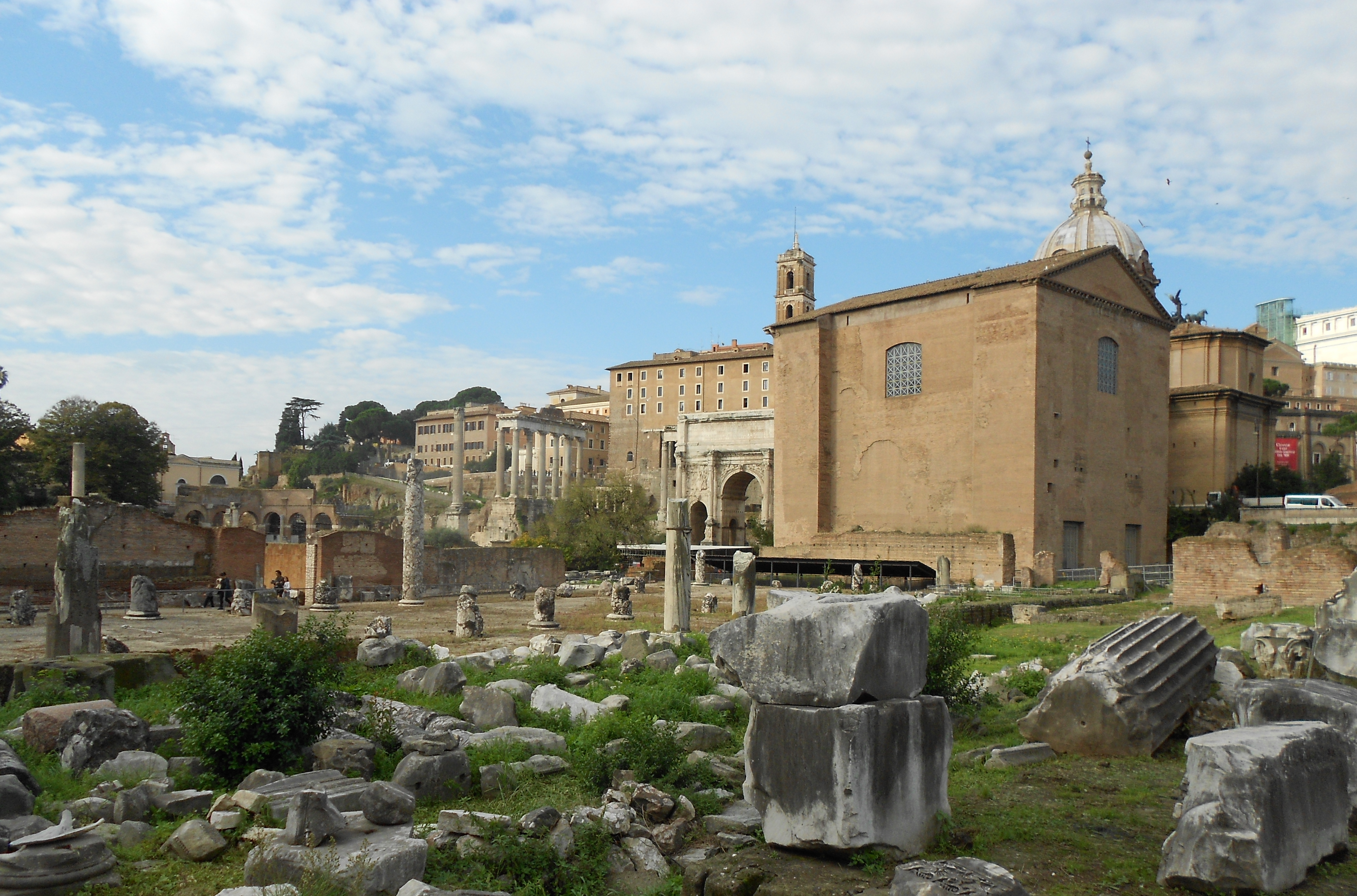
The Curia Julia and the church of St. Martina and Luca

== See also ==
- Cicero
- Curia Cornelia
- Curia Hostilia
- Curia of Pompey
- Graecostasis
- Lapis Niger
- Roman Forum
- List of monuments of the Roman Forum
- Rostra
- Theatre of Pompey
- Assassination of Julius Caesar

Preceded by Comitium	Landmarks of Rome; Curia Julia	Succeeded by Portico Dii Consentes
