= Alexandre Grandazzi =

French philologist (born 1957)

- Born: 8 February 1957
- Occupations: historian, archaeologist, classicist
- Known for: research on Roman history

Alexandre Grandazzi (born 8 February 1957) is a French university professor, a specialist of archaeology and Roman history.

== University career ==
- Former student of the École normale supérieure (class 1976 Lettres)
- Agrégé de lettres classiques
- Former member of the École française de Rome
- Professor at the Latin UFR dof the Université de Paris-Sorbonne.

== Principal publications ==
- Grandazzi, Alexandre (1991). La Fondation de Rome. Histoire. Paris: Les Belles Lettres. ISBN 978-2251380100.
- Grandazzi, Alexandre (2003). Les Origines de Rome. Que sais-je?. Paris: Presses Universitaires de France. ISBN 978-2130532194.
- Grandazzi, Alexandre (2008). Alba Longa, histoire d'une légende : Recherches sur l'archéologie, la religion, les traditions de l'ancien Latium. BEFAR. Ecole Française de Rome. ISBN 978-2728304127.
