= Graecostasis =

Platform near the Roman Forum

Coordinates: 41.8928°N 12.4850°E

- The Graecostasis as it may have appeared in its last construction as a permanent level "grandstand". Not illustrated is the Rostra Vetera.

Rostra

Comitium

Curia Julia
- Roman government: Political institutions
- The Graecostasis probably began as a temporary wooded structure, moved several times and eventually may have been a permanent stone edifice.

The Graecostasis (Ancient Greek: Γραικόστασις) was a platform in the Comitium near the Roman Forum, located to the west of the Rostra. Placed at the southwest end of the Comitium, the platform was the designated spot for all representatives of foreign nations and dignitaries from the Republic and Empire's domain.

Visiting outsiders were not permitted within the Senate House or Curia and instead may have stood on this platform while waiting to meet with senators or to hear orations from the Rostra to its east side. Although one scholar has disputed this interpretation and argues that it may have served as a viewing platform for entertainment.

== Name ==
It got its name from the fact that the first envoys thus honoured were Greeks from Massilia.

== Overview ==
The Graecostasis was, as Niebuhr remarks, like privileged seats in the hall of a parliamentary assembly. The Stationes Municipiorum, of which Pliny speaks, appear to have been places allotted to municipals for the same purpose. When the sun was seen from the Curia coming out between the Rostra and the Graecostasis, it was mid-day; and an accensus of the consul announced the time with a clear loud voice.

Much of the history of the structure has been effected in the same way as other known similar monuments. When the orators on the Rostra faced north towards the Curia to speak, the Graecostasis was aligned along a hemicircle believed to have been the outer footprint of the Comitium amphitheater, removed when a moratorium against permanent theatre was placed on the city. It is believed this may have been from riots stirred up by political speeches on the Rostra or a political theatrical performance or show.

While there have been excavations of the site, the exact location remains unclear. Several layers of rubble in the Comitium show constant changes within a small period of time, which raised the level of the space and, consequently, the location of the platform. Many historians believe that the Rostra maintained its location in the Comitium during varied restorations and construction, as that platform was a permanent fixture of Roman politics and held in an honored and elevated status, while the Graecostasis was presumed to be a simple wooden structure. A theory has been put forth that the finale phase of the structure was constructed of stone and concrete and is visible in the topmost layer, directly beneath the contemporary ground level, next to the remains of the original Rostra before it was moved by Julius Caesar.

Due in part to confusion over a similarly named structure nearby and the Roman use of many Greek traditions, the location has been debated; however contemporary writings from the time do distinguish two separate structures, of which the Graecostadium is one, but much larger and a complete architectural building. Its use was for training and exercise and is the ancient equivalent to a large, complicated gymnasium.

== Surrounding area ==
Near the Graecostasis and Rostra was an ancient shrine called the Vulcanal. It and the Lapis Niger represent the oldest parts of the Comitium space. The altar, originally a shrine to the god Vulcan, became the first suggestum or speakers platform, similar in nature to the Rostra, and was probably first used for oration by the kings of Rome. The environs of the Vulcanal, Rostra and the Graecostasis is also the site of several historic monuments as well as two trees supposedly planted by Romulus. A cypress and a lotus tree stood close to these structures; the age and size of these trees were so great that it was recorded that their roots had begun to undermine the ground beneath the Forum of Caesar.

== History ==
The original location of the Comitium was on a shelf like slope of the Capitoline Hill. This shelf was wider due to the depression between two summits of the hill and located directly in front of the Tabularium. This is the location of a terrace where the three original races met on neutral ground, outside the fortifications of their individual settlements and tribes, and provided a location for the first buildings of mutual government. When the Tiber flooded, water would cover the Forum and Comitium stalling all business for days on end. It was for this reason that many of the original buildings were placed upon higher ground and the lower level was reserved for assemblies, elections and public shows, making it necessary to be free from major permanent obstructions. It is believed that both the original Rostra and Graecostasis were just such non-permanent structures, being simple raised, wooden tribunals that could be assembled, disassembled and moved where needed.
