= Curia Hostilia =

Roman senate house

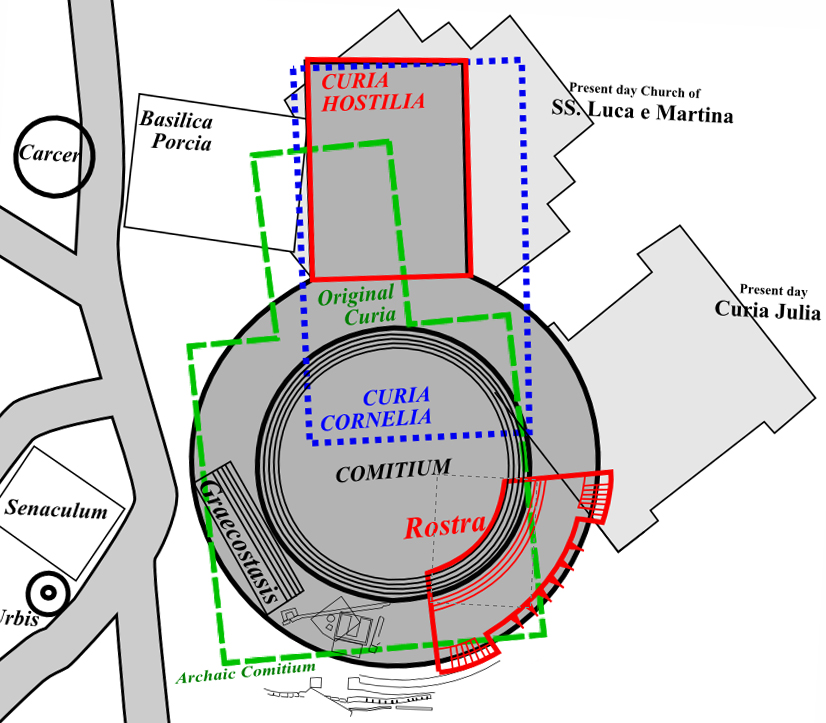
- Curia Hostilia in red with the Republican Comitium diagram

- Location within Rome
- 41°53′35″N 12°29′07″E
- Type: Government building
- Location: Region VIII Forum Romanum

History
- Built: 7th century BC
- Built by: Tullus Hostilius

The Curia Hostilia was one of the original senate houses or "curiae" of the Roman Republic. It was believed to have begun as a temple where the warring tribes laid down their arms during the reign of Romulus (r. c. 771–717 BC). During the early monarchy, the temple was used by senators acting as a council to the king. Tullus Hostilius (r. 673–641 BC) was believed to have replaced the original structure after fire destroyed the converted temple. It may have held historic significance as the location of an Etruscan mundus and altar. The Lapis Niger, a series of large black marble slabs, was placed over the altar (known as the Volcanal) where a series of monuments was found opposite the Rostra. This curia was enlarged in 80 BC by Lucius Cornelius Sulla during his renovations of the Comitium. That building burned down in 52 BC when the supporters of the murdered Publius Clodius Pulcher used it as a pyre to cremate his body.

== History ==
There has been a meeting house for the people of Rome through most of Rome's history. This one likely began as a temple.

=== Architecture and layout ===
There may have been a small shrine to the god Vulcan from the earliest period, a stone altar with a marble stele inscribed with a dedication from a Latin king. An honorary column was also among the tightly packed items. This spot was separated from the rest of the comitium with a low rising concrete fence to keep pedestrians from walking atop it.

The Curia Hostilia architecture had changed a number of times, but maintained its original form even after a number of refurbishments. The structure was where all of Rome's early political life centered. It is said that the public was always allowed to stroll into the Curia Hostilia to listen to the senators debate.

Relatively little is known about the Curia Hostilia. One feature of the Curia that is mentioned in almost all sources is the "Tabula Valeria", a painting on the exterior of the Curia's western wall. It depicted the victory of Manius Valerius Maximus Corvinus Messalla over Hiero and the Carthaginians in 263 BC. Pliny says that the painting was the first such picture in Rome.

Another detail that most sources agree on is that the Curia Hostilia was located on the north side of the comitium. It is believed that the circular set of stairs of the Comitium, which also doubled as seating for citizens listening to speakers at the Rostra, led up to the Curia's entrance. With regard to the Curia's location, Stambaugh writes, "[T]he Curia Hostilia was built on rising ground so as to dominate the whole space of the Forum Romanum". Given its prominent place in the Forum, it seems that the Curia Hostilia was a symbol of the strength of the Roman Republic.

The original Etruscan Temple was probably used as the meeting place of the separate tribes of the seven hills. It may have had only two columns and an open portico. It is believed the temple was converted by bricking up the front portico creating an anteroom. There may have been a balcony created above this space with an opening for public viewing but little is known about how this addition may have looked like. It is believed the exterior may well have looked almost exactly the same as the Curia Julia as the classic lines of the simple structure match the lines of the Etruscan Temple.

=== Destruction by fire ===
The building was destroyed in 52 BC after the makeshift funeral fire (with benches from the curia) for Publius Claudius Pulcher ignited the structure, burning it to the ground. It was replaced with the Curia Cornelia, located in almost the same space. This structure was in turn replaced by the Curia Julia started by Julius Caesar and finished by Emperor Augustus.
