= Curia of Pompey =

Meeting room of the Roman Senate

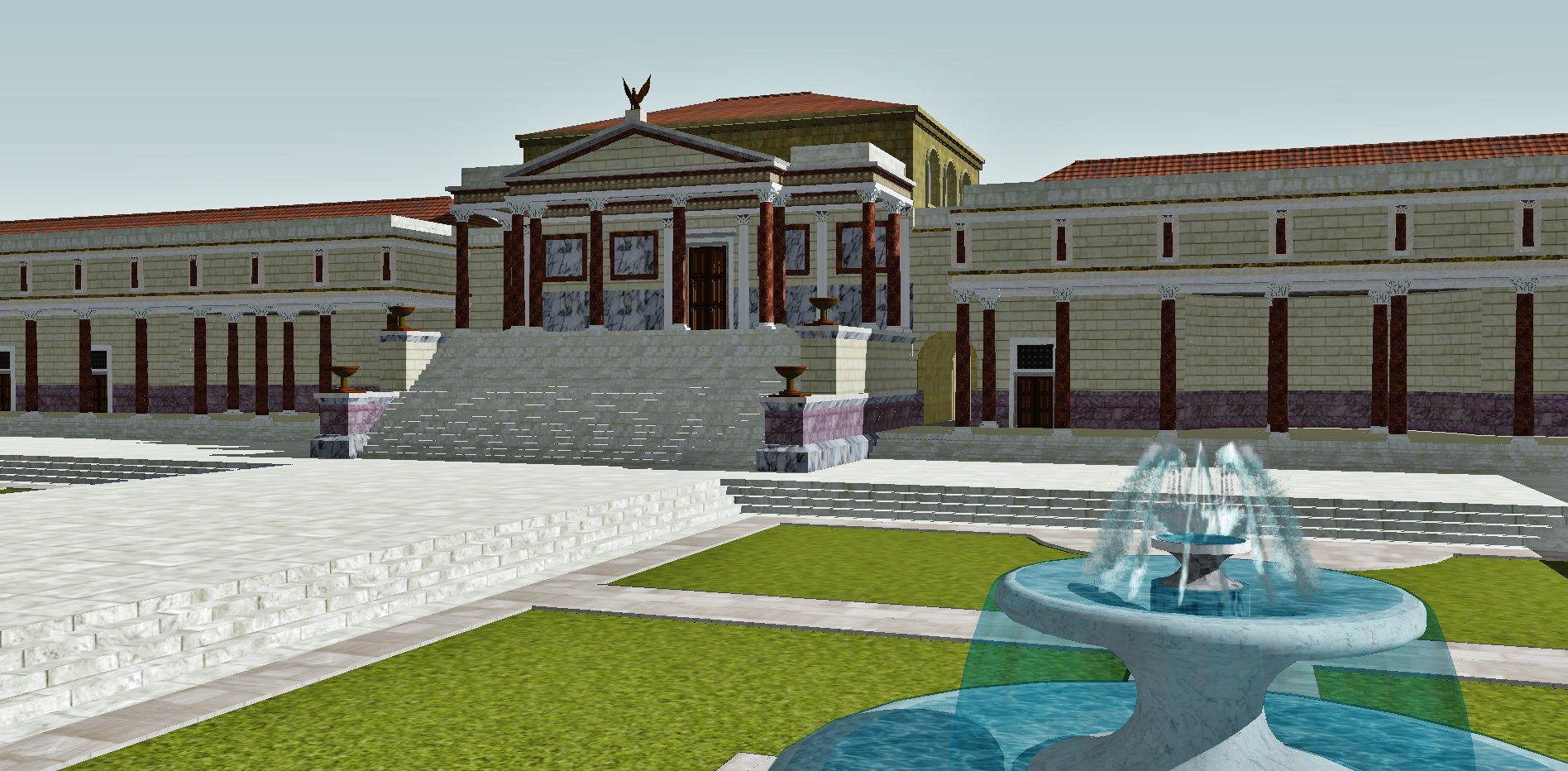
- A 3D reconstruction of the Curia of Pompey

- Location within Rome
- 41.895°N 12.474°E
- Type: Exedra
- Location: Regio IX Circus Flaminius

History
- Built: 62 BC
- Built by: Gnaeus Pompeius Magnus

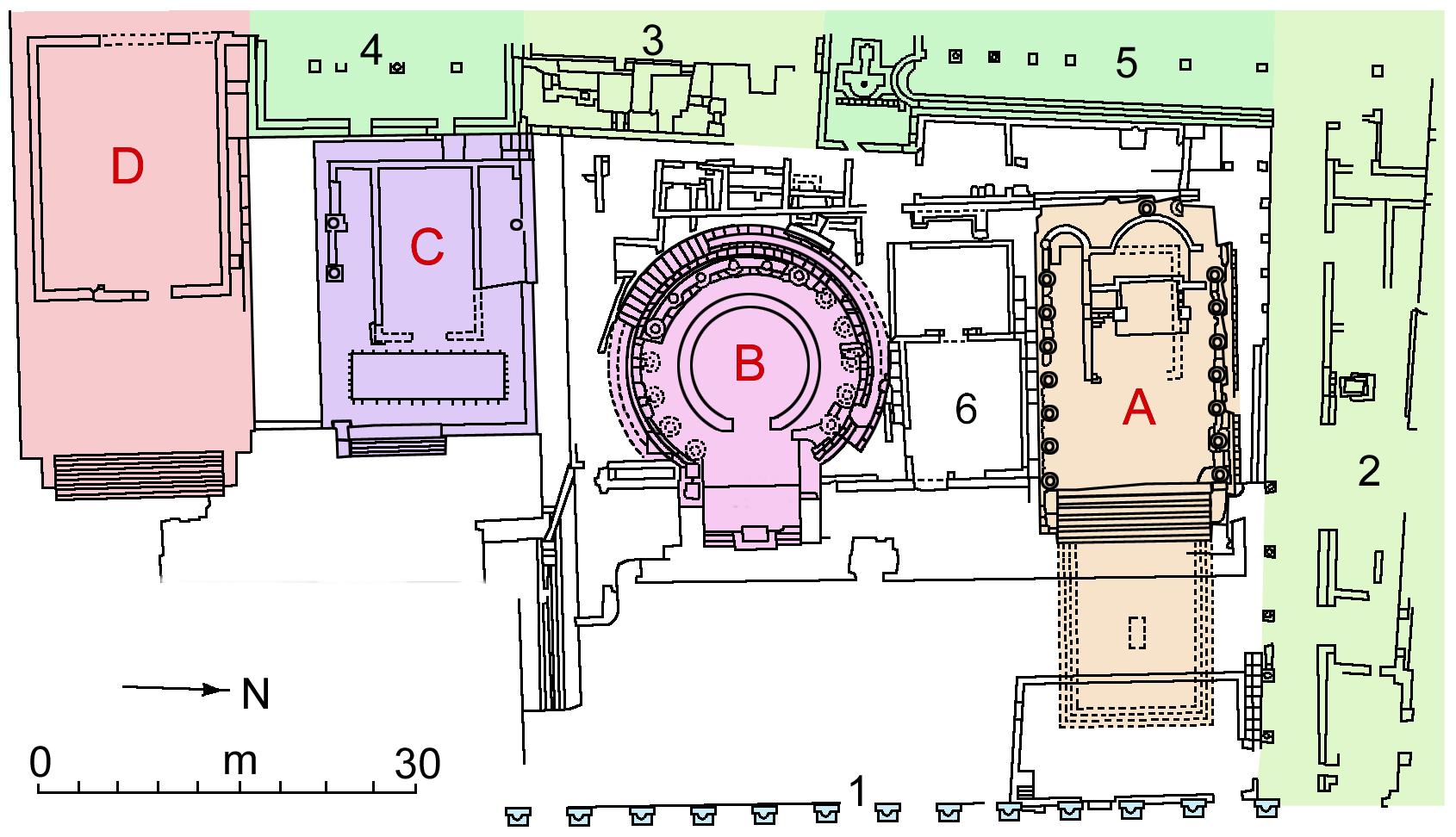
A diagram of the Largo Argentina, the Curia is number 3

The Curia of Pompey was one of several named meeting halls from Republican Rome of historic significance. A curia was a designated structure for meetings of the senate. The Curia of Pompey was located at the entrance to the Theater of Pompey.

The curia was attached to the porticus directly behind the theatre section and was a Roman exedra, with a curved back wall and several levels of seating. It was where the Senate met on the Ides of March in 44 BC and where the dictator Julius Caesar was assassinated. After Caesar's death, his heir Augustus removed the large statue of Pompey and had the hall walled up.

== History ==
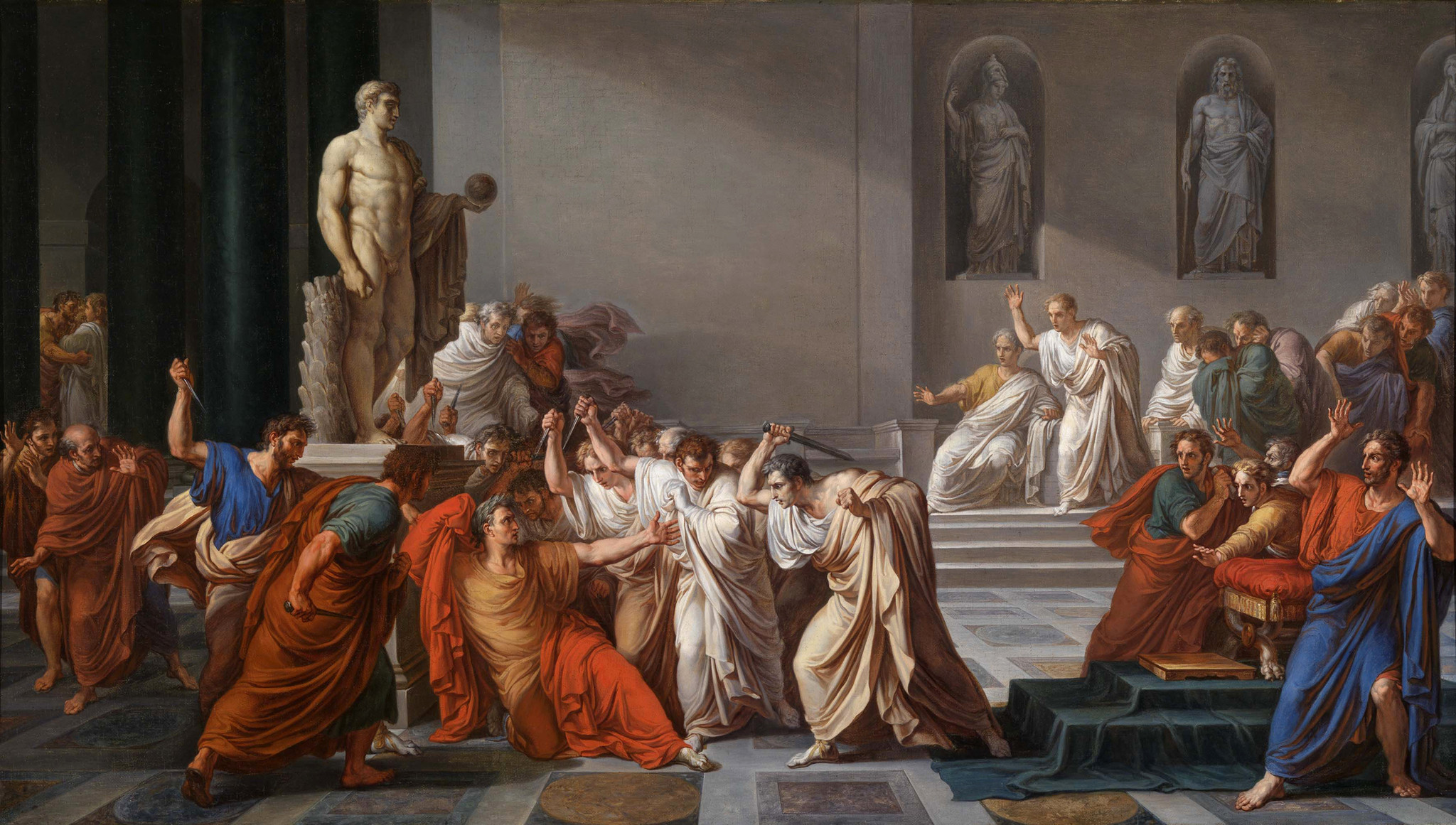
The Death of Julius Caesar by Vincenzo Camuccini, 1806

=== Construction ===
In 55 BC, Gnaeus Pompeius Magnus (Pompey the Great) dedicated the opening of the largest theater in the ancient world before its full completion. The full structure consisted of a large theater section, incorporating a temple, a pulpitum or stage, scaenae frons and cavea (seating) at one end, a large quadriporticus that surrounded an extensive garden and housed Pompey's collection of art and literature, and the curia itself at the opposite end from the theater.

Built from the profits of his war campaigns, the structure was a political statement meant to raise the status of the Roman general and consul, as well as to memorialize his achievements throughout his career.

=== Use as Senate House ===
The construction of his own curia allowed Pompey to host Senate meetings in a space he could access. As he held imperium, he could not attend meetings held in the Curia Hostilia inside the city limits. After the Curia Hostilia burned down during the funeral of Publius Clodius Pulcher in 52 BC, the Senate needed a place to hold meetings. Pompey's complex was sometimes used as an alternate meeting place, even after his death in 48 BC. On the Ides of March in 44 BC, a meeting of the Senate was held in the curia, while gladiatorial games were being held in the theatre. During that meeting, Julius Caesar was assassinated in the curia at the foot of Pompey's statue.

=== Aftermath of Assassination ===
While the theater complex overall would stand for centuries, the curia itself would last for only about a decade. During Augustus' rule he had the statue of Pompey in it removed – moving it to another place in Pompey's theatre complex – and later had the curia walled up. It was some time later converted into a latrine, according to Cassius Dio.

== Archaeology ==
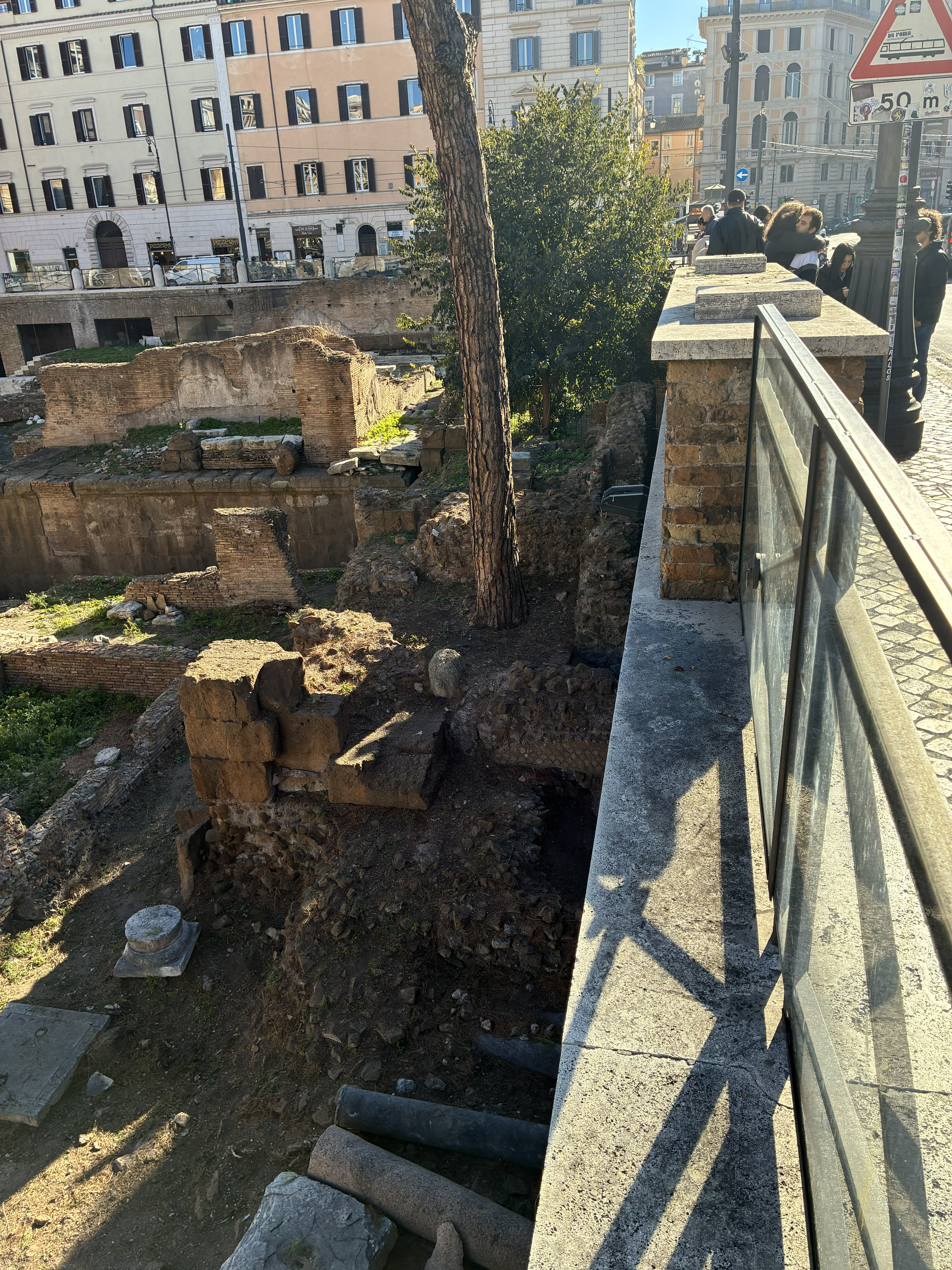
View of the back wall of the Curia Pompeia

The structure is located in an area now called Largo di Torre Argentina. The site was excavated by order of the dictator Benito Mussolini in the 1930s. For the most part, only the foundations of the original structure have been excavated and a modern roadway and rail system are now raised above the remains of the curia. As of 2023, the site has been opened for tourists to access via constructed walkways. All that remains visible of the curia is the back wall. Visitors can now walk around the site where Julius Caesar was assassinated, as opposed to viewing it from the street above.

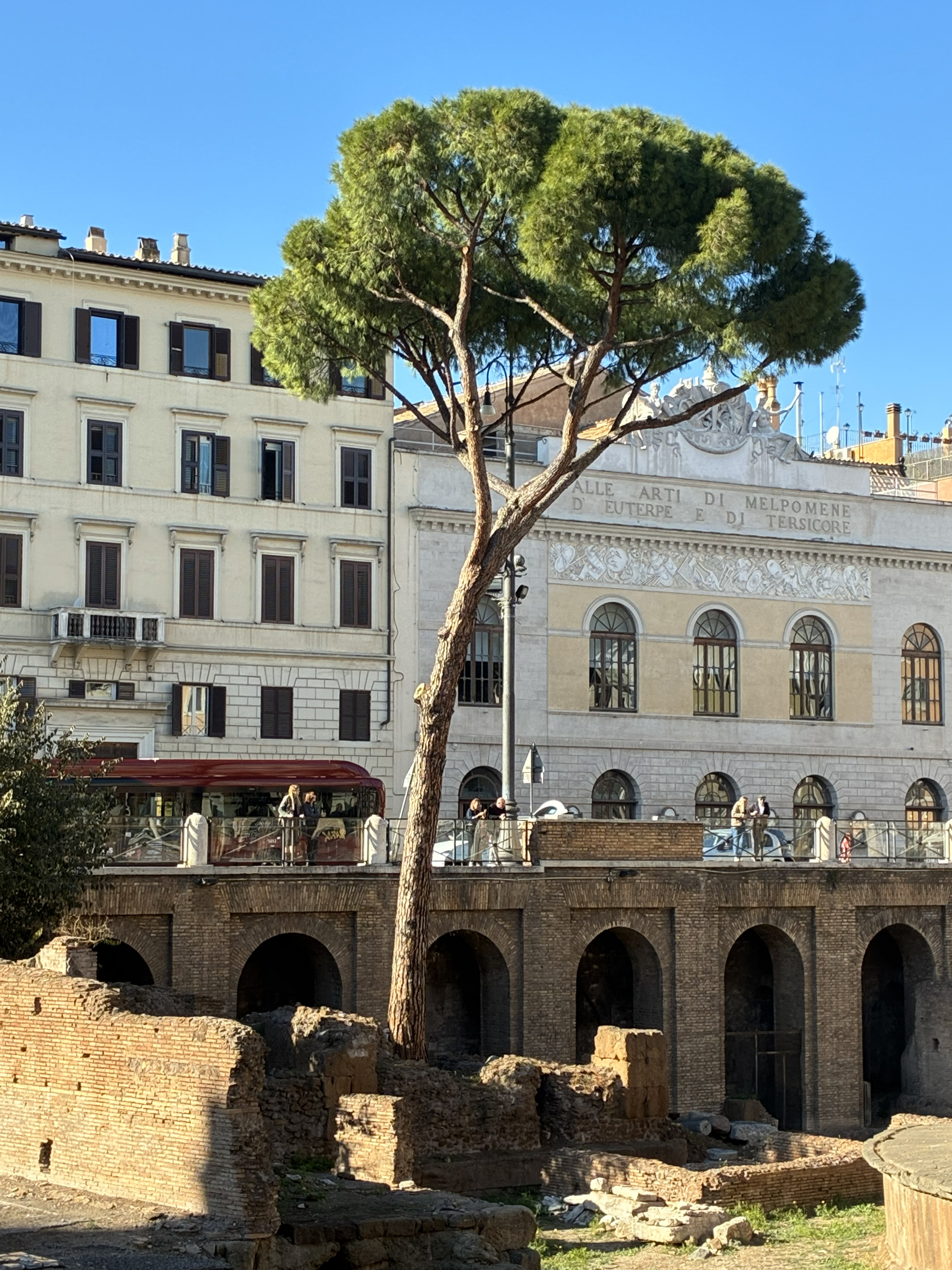
View of the back wall of the Curia Pompeia with a pine tree rising from the middle

== Bibliography ==
- Richardson, L (1992). "Curia Pompeii". A New Topographical Dictionary of Ancient Rome. Johns Hopkins University Press. pp. 104. ISBN 978-0-8018-4300-6.
- Russell, A (2015). "Pompey and the privatisation of public space on the Campus Martius". The Politics of Public Space in Republican Rome. Cambridge University Press. pp. 153–186. ISBN 9781107040496.
