= Navel (disambiguation) =

The navel is a scar on the abdomen caused when the umbilical cord is removed from a newborn baby.

Navel may also refer to:

- Beef navel, the ventral part of the plate
- Navel (company), a Japanese software publisher
- Navel orange, a seedless strain of oranges
- Navel (album), a 1994 album by Jimsaku
- NAVEL, an anatomy mnemonic

== See also ==
- Fuzzy navel, a cocktail
- Navel in human culture
- Navel of the World (disambiguation)
- Navel of the Earth (disambiguation)
- Naval, referring to a navy
- Belly button (disambiguation)
