= Umbilical =

Umbilical may refer to:

== Biology ==
- Umbilical cord
- Umbilical fold
- Umbilical hernia
- Umbilical notch
- Umbilical vessels
  - Umbilical artery
  - Umbilical vein
- Umbilical zone
- Umbilical region

== Other ==
- Umbilical cable, in engineering
  - Diver's umbilical, a cable including at minimum, breathing gas supply hose, communications cable, pneumofathometer hose, and a strength member, used in surface-supplied diving.
- The Umbilical Brothers, two Australian comedic performers, David and Shane
- Umbilical point, a locally spherical point on a mathematical surface.
- Umbilical (Tiago Iorc album), a 2011 album of Tiago Iorc, Brazilian musician
- Umbilical (Thou album), a 2024 album
- "Umbilical", a song by Arca from Sheep

== See also ==
- Umbilicus (disambiguation)
