= Center of gravity (disambiguation) =

The center of gravity of a body is the point around which the resultant torque due to gravity forces vanishes.

Center of gravity or centre of gravity may also refer to:

- Center of Gravity (festival), an annual Canadian sport and music festival
- Center of gravity (military), a concept developed by Carl Von Clausewitz, a Prussian military theorist
- Geographical centre, sometimes known as "gravitational centre" (typically of a country, or other large region of the Earth)

== See also ==
- Center of gravity of an aircraft
- Center of mass
- Center of the World (disambiguation)
- Centre of gravity frame
- Centre of gravity wavelength
- Metacentric height
