= Altar of Saturn =

Ancient Roman altar in the Roman Forum

Coordinates: 41.8927°N 12.4845°E

- Ara Saturni (Latin)
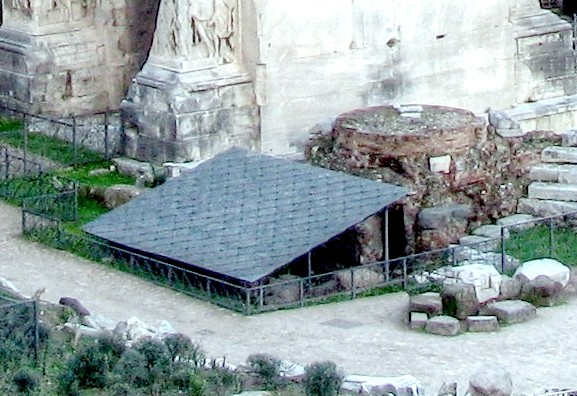
- Shelter covering the altar of Saturn
- Interactive map of Altar of Saturn

History
- Built: Sixth century BCE

Site notes
- Material: Tuff
- Length: 2.8 m (9 ft 2 in)
- Width: 3.95 m (13.0 ft)
- Archaeologists: Rodolfo Lanciani

The altar of Saturn (Latin: Ara Saturni) is an archaic altar dedicated to the god Saturn. Constructed in the sixth century BCE, it continued to be used until the Roman Empire collapsed. It is located in front of the Temple of Saturn in the Roman Forum and its remains were uncovered by Rodolfo Lanciani in 1902.

== Location ==
Italian archaeologist Rodolfo Lanciani discovered the remains of the altar in 1902 near the Arch of Septimius Severus. It was first thought that the remains were of the Vulcanal. The altar stands in front of the Temple of Saturn, next to the Umbilicus urbis Romae, and south of the senaculum of the Roman Forum.

== History ==
The altar was constructed prior to the Temple of Saturn in the sixth century BCE and remained in use to appease the god Saturn until the collapse of the Roman Empire. It was erected by the Pelasgians in honour of Saturn, the first god of the capitol, which was named Saturnia to honour him. Ancient sources state that the altar of Saturn is situated nearby another altar dedicated to god Dīs Pater and goddess Proserpina; that altar is believed to have hosted the Saturnalia festival. The altar of Saturn is rectangular and measures 3.95 by 2.8 metres (13.0 by 9.2 ft). It was constructed from blocks of tuff.

The Romans had believed that Dīs Pater must be appeased by offering him human heads, and Saturn could be appeased by offering him victims. Despite this, it became practice to appease Dīs Pater with masks with human faces fashioned onto them, and Saturn was appeased with lights of kindling; this is due to a change in the interpretation of phôta, which can mean either "lights" or "man". This change of practice led to the exchange of candles in the festival Saturnalia.
