= The Middle of the World =

The Middle of the World may refer to one of the following films:

- The Middle of the World (1974 film), a Swiss-French romance film by Alain Tanner
- The Middle of the World (2003 film), a Brazilian drama film by Vicente Amorim

== See also ==
- Mitad del Mundo (disambiguation)
- Center of the World (disambiguation)
