= Center of the World =

Center of the World may refer to:

- The axis mundi, the point on the Earth's surface having the greatest cosmological significance
- Center of the World, Ohio, an unincorporated community in Ohio
- Center of the World (album), a 1972 album by free jazz quartet Center of the World
- The Center of the World (novel), a 1988 novel by Andreas Steinhöfel
- The Center of the World, a 2001 film by Wayne Wang

== See also ==
- Axis mundi
- Navel of the World (disambiguation)
- The Middle of the World (disambiguation)
- Center of gravity (disambiguation)
- Earth's inner core
- Centre of the Earth, a purpose-built environmental education centre in Birmingham, England
