= Vulcanal =

Roman temple

Coordinates: 41°53′33.82″N 12°29′4.44″E

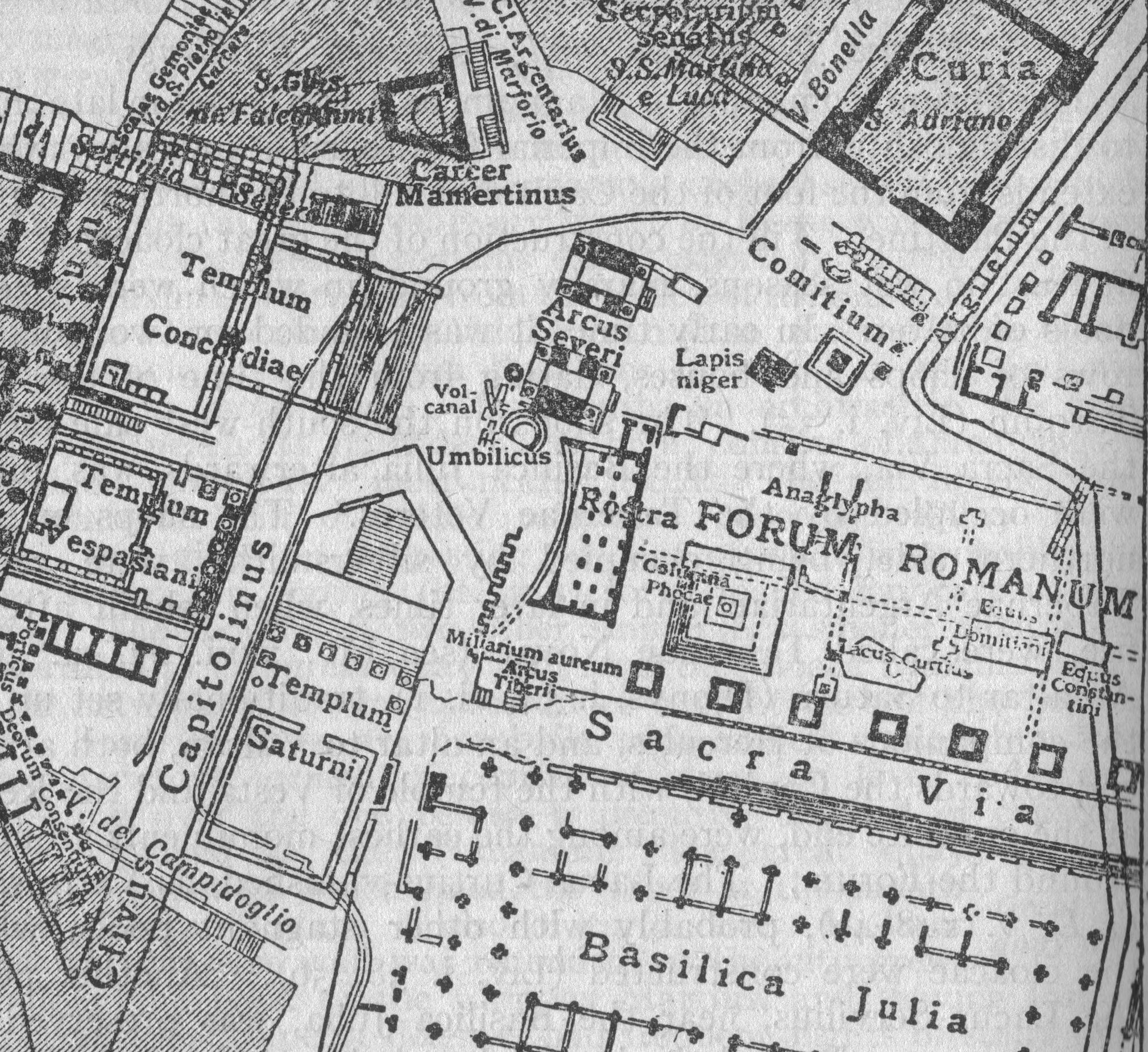
Map (1926) of the western end of the Roman Forum: the Volcanal is indicated between the Arch of Severus and the stairs of the Temple of Concord, just northwest of the Umbilicus and Rostra.

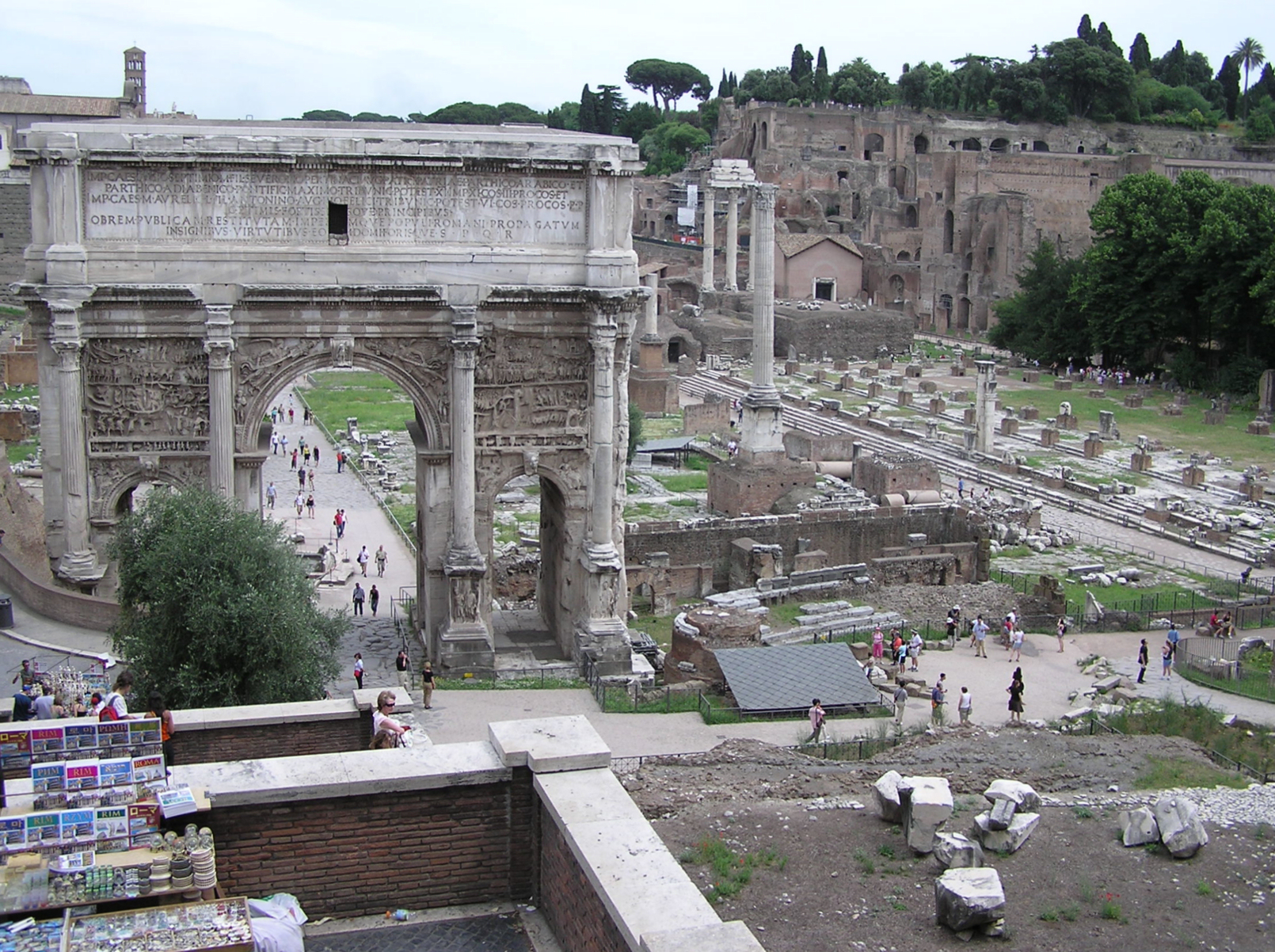
The site identified by Boni as the Vulcanal is today protected by a modern gray roof. The excavation is just off the southwest corner of the Arch of Severus and adjacent to the truncated masonry cone of the Umbilicus Urbis. The ruins of the (mostly reconstructed) Rostra Augusti are visible just beyond.

The Shrine of Vulcan (Italian: Volcanale), or Vulcanal, or Volcanal, was an 8th-century BC sacred precinct on the future site of the Roman Forum in Rome, modern Italy. Dedicated to Vulcan, the Roman god of fire, it was traditionally considered to commemorate the spot where the legendary figures Romulus and Tatius concluded the peace treaty between the tribes known as the Latins — on the Palatine Hill — and the Sabines — on the Quirinal and Esquiline. This famous merger of the hill-villages was said to be the foundation of the Roman state.

== Description ==
The original Vulcanal was an open-air altar on the slopes of the Capitoline Hill in Rome in the area that would later become the Comitium and Roman Forum. It was located in the open here, between the hill-villages, in the days before Rome existed, because the fire god was considered to be too destructive to be located anywhere near an occupied house. (He was mainly worshiped in order to avert fires.) It contained a lotus tree and cypress tree long honored as being older than the city of Rome itself. According to literary sources, the site originally featured a sculpture of a four-horse chariot (quadriga) celebrating Romulus' victory over the Caeninenses (citizens of Caenina) — and said to have been dedicated by Romulus himself. This was later supplemented with a statue of that king, inscribed with Greek letters and celebrating his deeds. Other monuments erected here from the earliest times included a statue of Horatius Cocles and another standing on a column and representing an actor who had been struck by lightning during the games in the Circus Maximus. Behind the excavated foundation of the altar of Vulcan are traces of a flight of steps, cut into the tufa of the Capitoline Hill, which lead up to the vestibule of the Temple of Concord, just to the northwest.

== History ==
In addition to its function as a place of worship, the Vulcanal became the Assembly place during the Roman monarchy in the days before the Comitium and Old Rostra (Rostra Vetera) existed. According to longstanding Roman tradition, the Vulcanal served as the speaker's platform at this time, a function much later assumed by the immediately adjacent Rostra. The archaic site had long been reverently preserved when, in 9 AD, the Emperor Augustus refurbished it with a new marble altar (discovered in 1548 and now in the Naples Museum). The Emperor Domitian (r. 81-96 AD) did likewise, presenting a new marble-faced altar and sacrificing a red calf and boar. Later in the Imperial period, the Vulcanal area suffered by being very much narrowed and partly done away with altogether by building operations associated with the enlargement of the Temple of Concord, the construction of the adjacent Arch of Severus, and other public works.

== Location ==
The precise location of the Vulcanal within what is now the west end of the Roman Forum is not completely settled. Two sites have been seriously proposed.

Giacomo Boni, who excavated extensively in this area in 1899–1905, established a site about 40 meters to the southwest of the Lapis Niger as the Vulcanal. This is just behind the Umbilicus Urbi and the (future) New Rostra (Rostra Augusti). Boni uncovered a small shrine here that had been cut directly out of the natural tufa and had tufa blocks defining a precinct area (identified from literary sources as the Area Volcani). This excavated site is about 13 by 9 feet, but the original Vulcanal is thought to have been somewhat larger. Boni's identification of this spot as the Vulcanal stood virtually unchallenged for over 80 years.

In 1983, however, Filippo Coarelli associated the Vulcanal with the site (also uncovered by Boni decades before) that by Imperial times had become known as the Lapis Niger. This archaic (8th century BC) sacred site may have been more or less contemporary with the Vulcanal. An altar (known as "Altar G-H" to archeologists) had also been found here and Coarelli suggested that the Vulcanal may not only have been associated with it but may have been identical with this shrine. (According to him, the altar identified by Boni as the Vulcanal was actually the Ara Saturni, or Altar of Saturn). Coarelli's hypothesis has received a mixed reception. While a number of authorities believe he is correct, other experts continue to insist that Boni's site is the correct one. For example, Richardson's authoritative A New Topographical Dictionary of Ancient Rome, published almost 10 years after Coarelli's work, has this to say:

The Vulcanal was distinctly higher than the forum...and Comitium...[T]he kings and magistrates transacted public business there...public assemblies were regularly held there.... [It] was also big enough to include a bronze aedicula.... All this taken together indicates that originally the Vulcanal covered the lower slope of the Capitoline along the stair that extended the line of the Sacra Via up the hill, an area later covered by the Temple of Concordia.

== See also ==
- List of monuments of the Roman Forum
