= Omphalion =

Central church ornament

Omphalion in Greek means "navel (of the earth)"; compare the omphalos of Delphi.

The most famous one, executed in technique opus sectile, is mosaic located in the Church of Hagia Sophia in Constantinople.

Also it is sacred circular marking slabs that were usually located in important or especially sacred churches throughout the Byzantine Empire and other Orthodox countries. The omphalion is the successor to the early Byzantine ambo and the predecessor of the modern cathedra. At certain points during the liturgy, the officiating bishop stood on the omphalion.

== Hagia Sophia ==
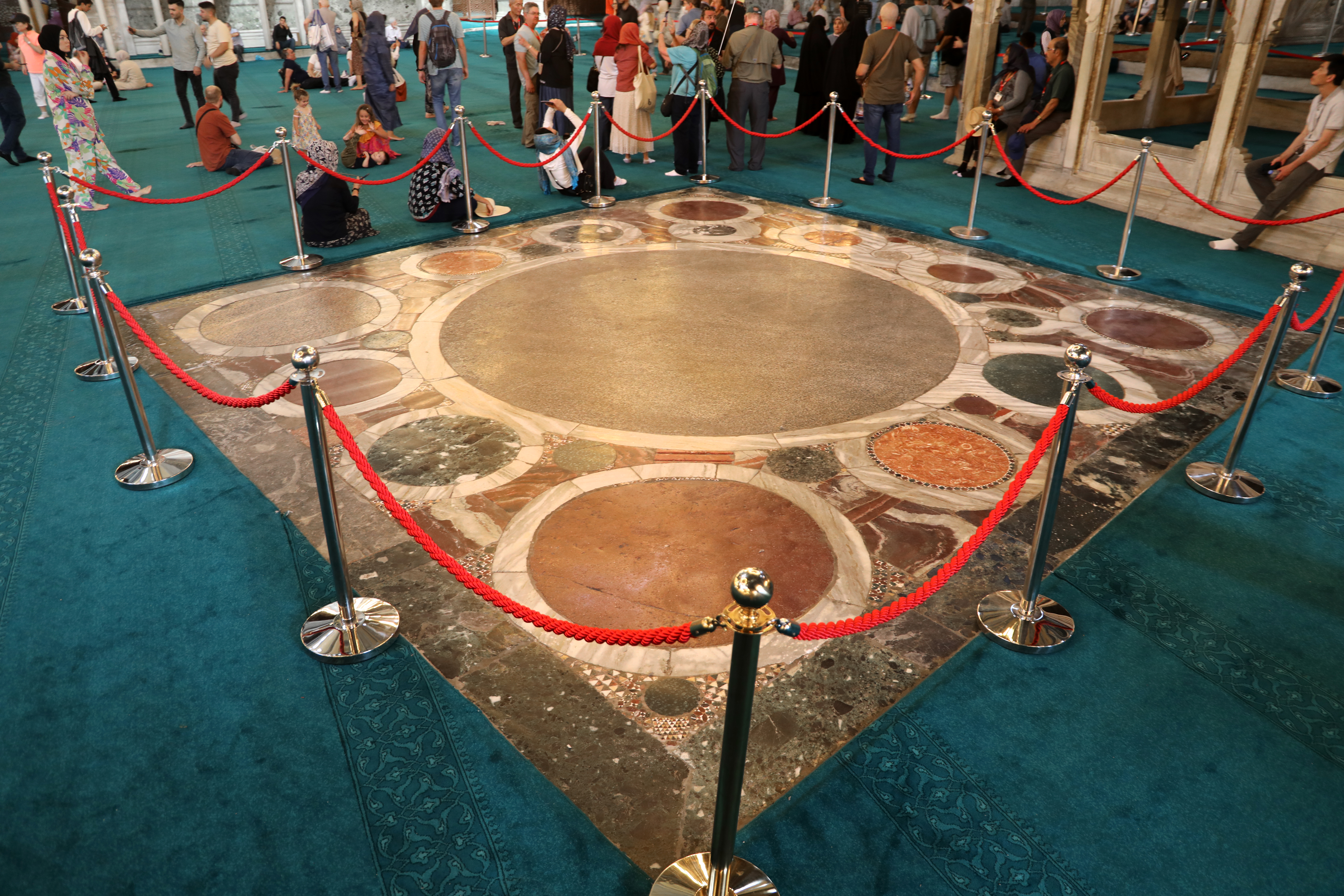
Omphalion at the Hagia Sophia

One of the most intriguing features of Hagia Sophia is a marble section of the floor known as the Omphalos. The Omphalos is located in the south-east quarter of the main square beneath the dome, exactly in the middle of the square. Each side measures 5.65 meters (18.5 feet). Within the square lay 30 circles of various sizes. There is one large circle in the middle; 4 circles of equal size at each corner; 2 smaller circles of similar size occupy the space between each corner circle; 16 smaller circles in-between these. The 3 remaining circles are on the south end and are linked to the 4 larger circles on that end.

The most striking feature of the Omphalos is the brilliant marble, with myriad types and colors mixed in. Marble was the material of choice for Imperial churches: it was believed to be created by earthy matter freezing in water that had sunk into the Earth's crust. The design is unusual and has been interpreted in many ways over the years. One interpretation could be that is that the central circle could be the Sun, with the Solar System orbiting around it. This would fit with the absolute rule of the Emperor. The asymmetry is particularly odd, given when compared to the omphalos at Hosios Loukas in Greece. This omphalos dates from the Middle Byzantine, some five hundred years after the Hagia Sophia's if it is indeed an original feature, and is completely symmetrical in design. Stylistically, the interiors of Hagia Sophia have been categorized as a "jeweled style". The materials utilized were selected to retain and reflect light. The mosaics used tesserae of varying colors, texturized and oriented to reflect the light pouring in from the massive dome. Color was very important as certain colors, and certain materials, conveyed messages of status and prestige. The effect of the sunlight shining through the windows surrounding the base of the dome hitting the tesserae would have been awe-inspiring. Comparatively, the Omphalos is more demure and understated.

Historically, it was thought to mark the spot where Byzantine emperors were crowned during the coronation ceremony. Evidence of this comes from Antony of Novgorod, who wrote a description of Hagia Sophia in the early 13th century. He wrote "there is a red marble stone with a golden throne placed on it. On this throne the emperors were crowned". This view has been challenged over the years because of the dearth of textual reference from writers and travelers in the Byzantine Era. Hagia Sophia herself has been altered so many times since the sixth-century that the Omphalion disappears and re-appears sporadically in the textual evidence that does exist. We know that it was covered over with carpets by the Ottomans after they converted it into a mosque. The design is unique to Hagia Sophia, with little in the way of direct comparisons. There are two examples from the 11th and 12th centuries, Hosios Lukas and Nea Moni. The comparison is difficult considering the 500 year difference. All of the marble used in the floors of St. Sophia was quarried around the time of construction.

Byzantine architecture of the time favored the incorporation of spolia to celebrate the triumph of Christianity over Paganism, as much of the spolia was sourced from Greek and Roman temples throughout the Empire. Dating of the Omphalos has varied, with some dating it to the reign of Justinian, and some dating it as a later addition, particularly to the reign of Basil I (867-886). The evidence used to argue for this later dating is the seemingly odd placement within Hagia Sophia. However, it is placed in the center of one of the four squares beneath the dome, indicating the placement was not as random as it seems at first glance. Historian Nadine Schibille argues that it fits seamlessly into the original flooring, therefore she concludes that it was an original feature. Historian Silvia Pedone does not attempt to assign a specific date to it, but she theorizes that it was arranged differently than what is seen today. Some of the smaller circles might have been an addition during re-decoration in the 9th century. The church suffered damage during an earthquake in 1346 that could have damaged the marble. This could account for the asymmetrical design, with repairs altering the overall design.

== Other Omphalion ==
The word omphalion (Russian "омфалий") is also used to describe other sacred circular marking slabs that were usually located in important or especially sacred churches throughout the Byzantine Empire and other Orthodox countries.

The marble omphalion from the floor of the Church of Hagia Sophia in Trabzon (north coast of modern Turkey) was brought to Thessalonica by Greek refugees in 1924.

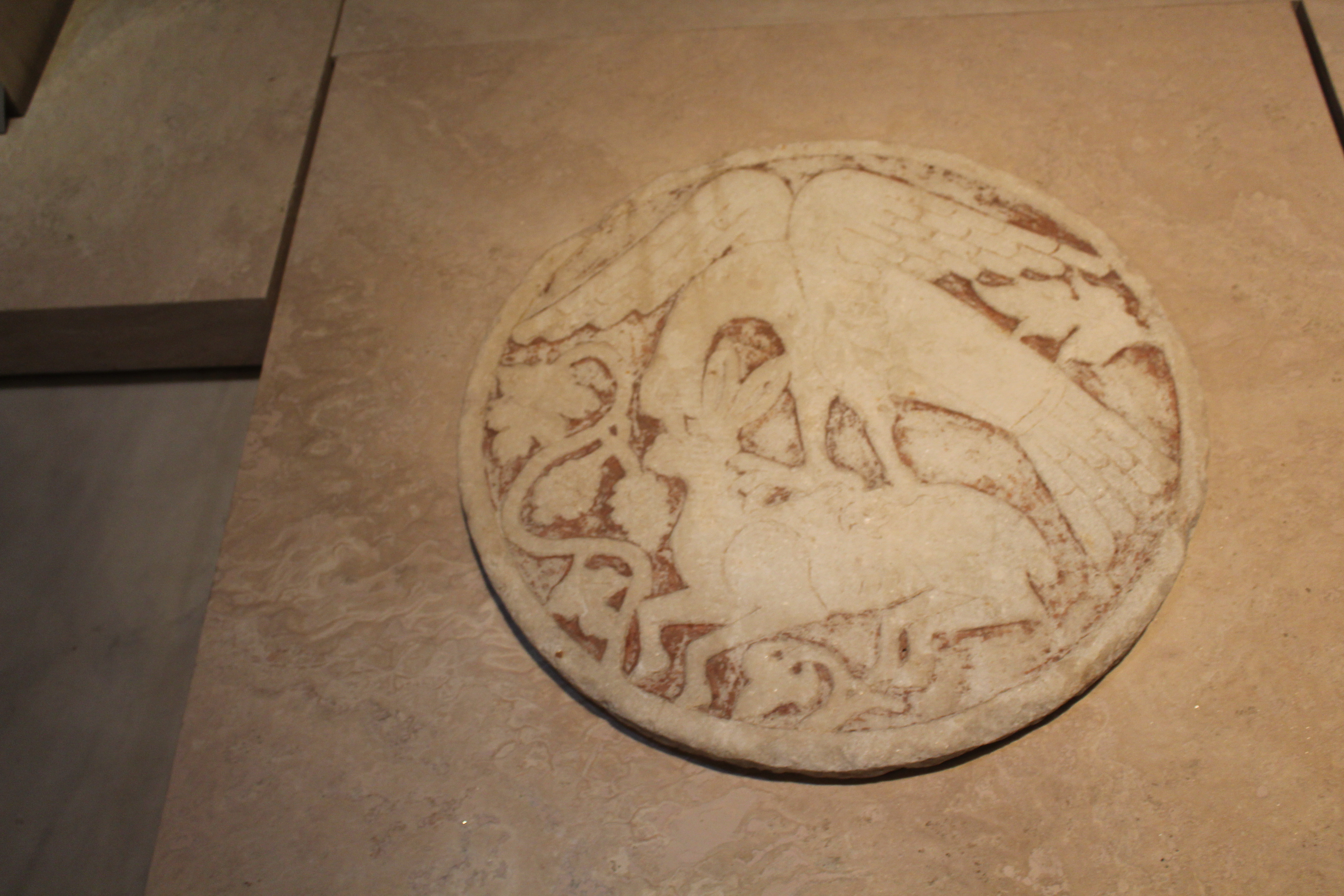
From Trabzon

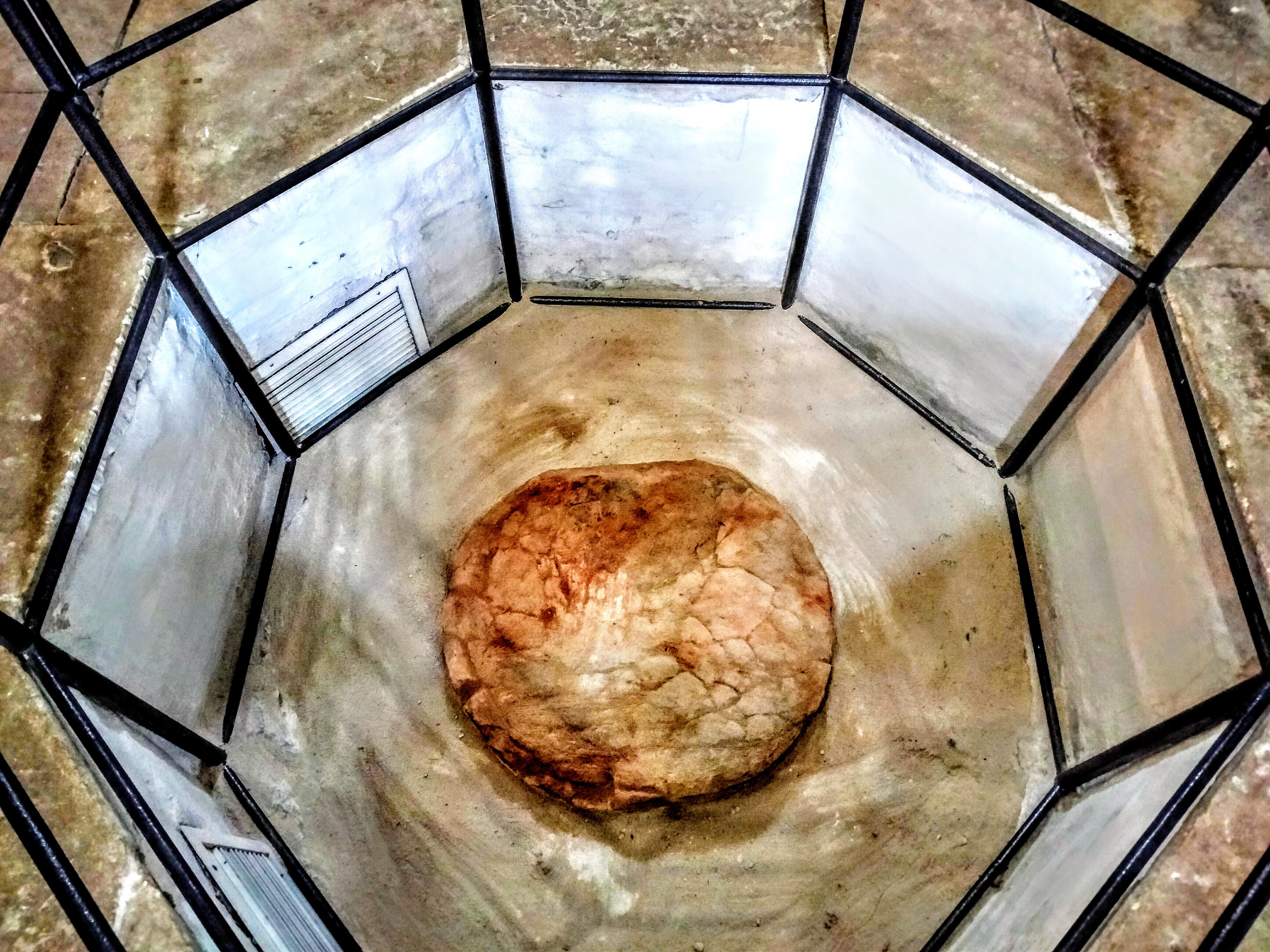
Kideksha church (Russia)

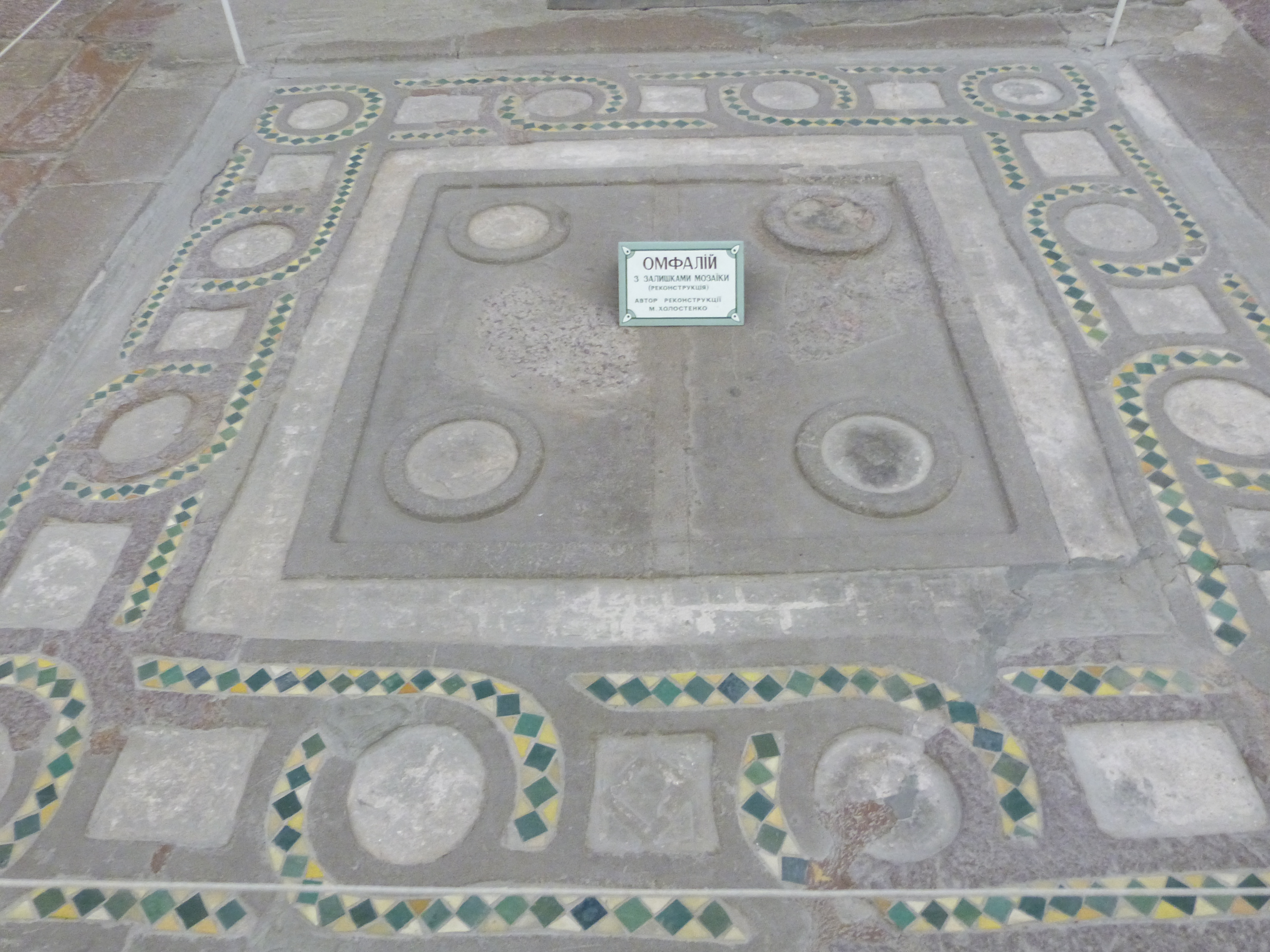
Chernihiv church (Ukraine)

== See also ==
- Omphalos
