= Chorobates =

Ancient Roman device for measuring slopes

- Chorobates - An ancient Roman device for measuring slopes
- Classification: Measuring instrument
- Related: Spirit level

The chorobates, described by Vitruvius in Book VIII of the De architectura, was used to measure horizontal planes and was especially important in the construction of aqueducts (mainly during Roman Times).

Similar to modern spirit levels, the chorobates consisted of a beam of wood 6 m in length held by two supporting legs and equipped with two plumb lines at each end. The legs were joined to the beam by two diagonal rods with carved notches. If the notches corresponding to the plumb lines matched on both sides, it showed that the beam was level. On top of the beam, a groove or channel was carved. If the condition was too windy for the plumb bobs to work effectively, the surveyor could pour water into the groove and measure the plane by checking the water level.

== Isaac Moreno Gallo's interpretation of the chorobates ==
Isaac Moreno Gallo, a Technical Engineer of Public Works specialized in Ancient Rome's civil engineering, claims that the present-day representation of the chorobates (in a table-like shape) is mistaken due to a misinterpretation derived from an incorrect translation of the Latin term "ancones" used by Vitruvius.

"...ea habet ancones in capitibus extremis aequali modo perfectos inque regulae capitibus ad nomam coagmentatos..."

In this context, "ancones" could be translated as "limbs" (extremidades) or "arms", but also as "ménsulas" (brackets or corbels). According to Isaac Moreno, this vertical design is way more efficient when it comes to optical leveling and makes more sense from a topographer's point of view. Furthermore, it preserves the original length described by Vitruvius (20 feet or 5.92 meters) that the table-like chorobates versions persistently seem to ignore.

This "vertical" chorobates was indeed the predominant interpretation of the chorobates in the oldest representations recorded: 1547's engravings included in Jean Goujon's translation of Vitruvius works into French. Or 1582's Miguel de Urrea's first edition of Vitruvius works, this time in Spanish. And few years later, when Juan de Lastanosa published “The Twenty-One Books of Engineering and Machines" of Gianello della Torre”.

All three of them consistently represented the chorobates in a very similar way, until 1673 Claude Perrault's translations radically altered the vertically shaped stand with "ménsulas" and turned it into a horizontal table-like chorobates (with "legs" instead of "brackets") that has become the standard representation nowadays.

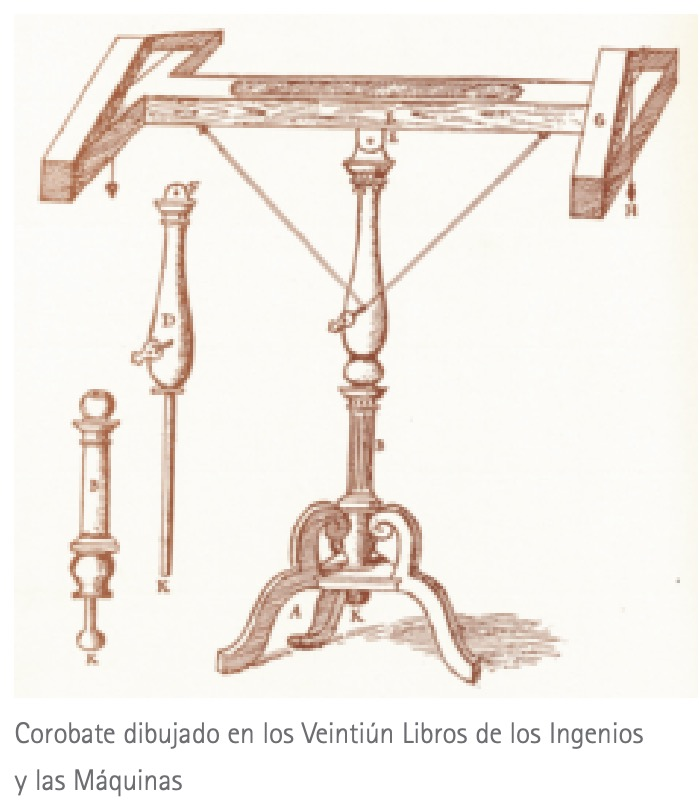
Gianello della Torre's interpretation of the chorobates in "The Twenty-One Books of Engineering and Machines"

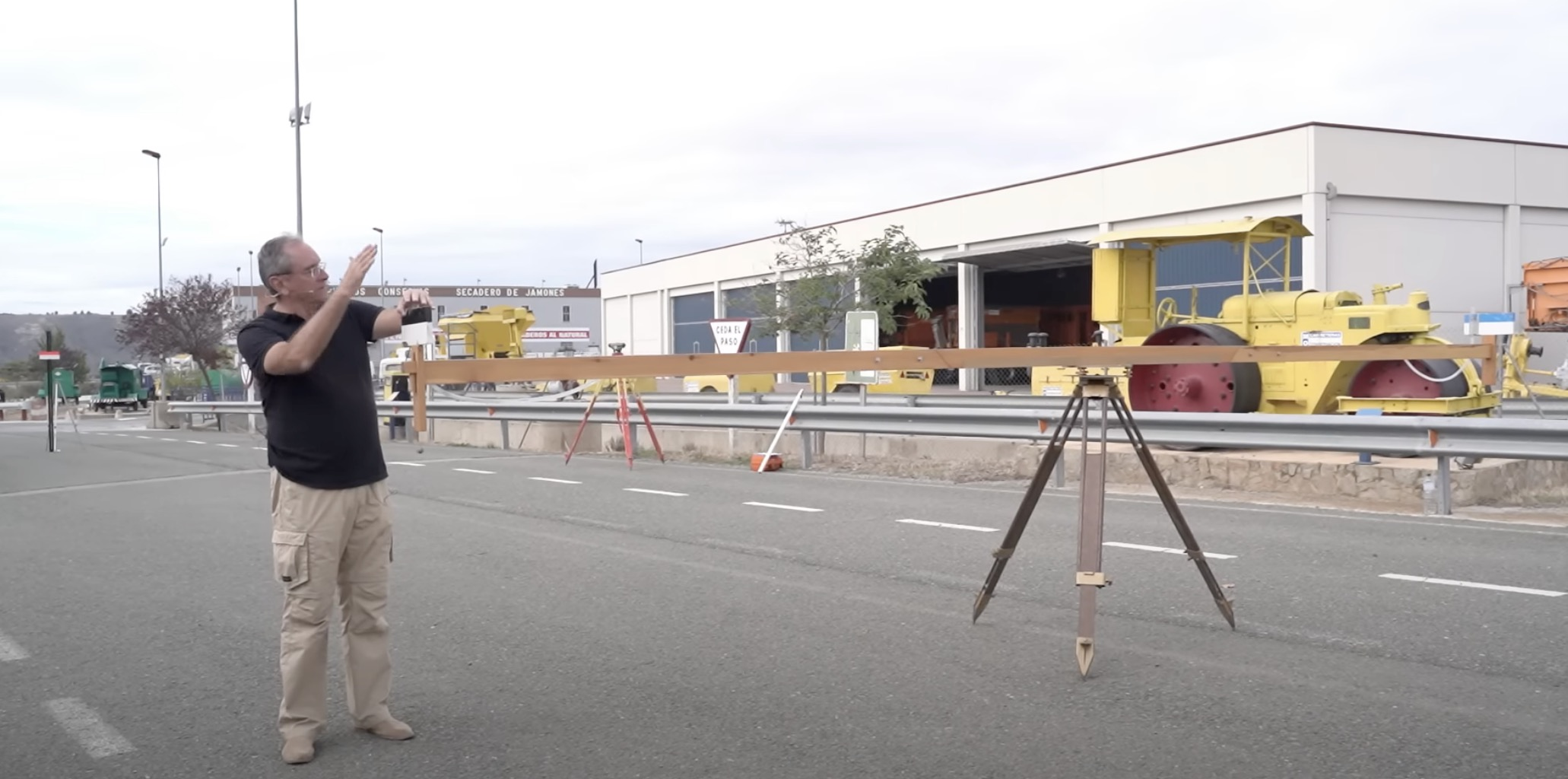
A demonstration showing the accuracy of the vertical chorobates version

In his "Ars Mensoria" series, Isaac Moreno Gallo recreates practical demonstrations of Roman topographic instruments using his own replicas. Among them, the chorobates.

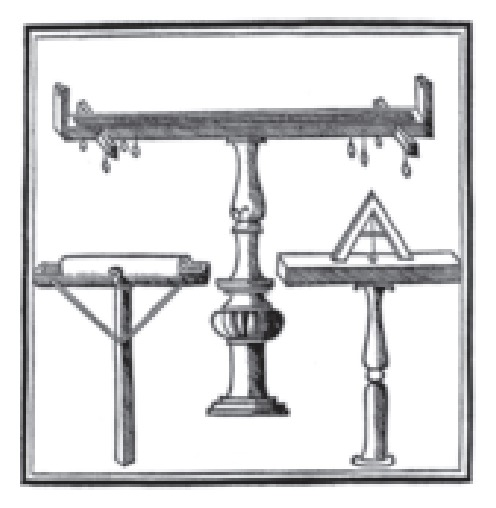
MARTIN, JEAN (Traducteur) et GOUJON, Jean (Dessinateur). 1547: Architecture ou Art de bien bastir, de Marc Vitruve Pollion autheur romain antique.

== See also ==
- Groma
- Dioptra
- Chorography
- Odometer
