= Umbilicus =

Umbilicus may refer to:

- The navel or belly button
- Umbilicus (mollusc), a feature of gastropod, Nautilus and Ammonite shell anatomy
- Umbilicus (plant), a genus of over ninety species of perennial flowering plants
- Umbilicus urbis Romae, the designated center of the city of Rome from which and to which all distances in Rome and the Roman Empire were measured
- Umbilicus (reference point), a central point used to plan an Ancient Roman city.
- Umbilicus mundi, or "the world's navel", a Greek artifact
- Umbilicus, an American rock band that includes members of death metal bands.
