= Navel of the World (disambiguation) =

The Navel of the World or Earth usually refers to the axis mundi or world axis, the supposed centre of the world or universe.

Navel of the World or Navel of the Earth may also refer to:

== Locations ==
- The omphalion ("navel") in Delphi, Greece
- The Foundation Stone in Jerusalem, Israel
- Calvary in Jerusalem, Israel
- Israel itself (טבור כדור הארץ, Tabbur HaAres, Ezek. 38:12)
- The Bodhi Tree in the Mahabodhi Temple in Bodh Gaya, India
- Mualiman napa, Kuopio
- The Hagia Sophia in Istanbul, Turkey
- Babylon in present-day Iraq
- The altar at Paphos, present-day Kouklia, Cyprus
- Mount Song or the nearby ancient capital Luoyang in central China
- Cusco, Peru, according to Incan tradition
- Baboquivari Peak Wilderness in Arizona, US, according to the O'odham nation
- A lithic site near Ahu Te Pito Kura, Easter Island
- Mir Mine, Sakha Republic, Siberia

== Popular culture ==
- El Ombligo del Mundo, an earlier name of the Argentinian radio program La Venganza Será Terrible
- Umbilicum mundi, a major plot device in Umberto Eco's novel Foucault's Pendulum
- "Navel of the World", part of the music of Chrono Trigger
- The Fountain of Cho in Mercadia in Magic: The Gathering
- Zenith (comics) - Axis Mundi is the central Universe, where the Lloigor plan to rule all alternate universes via the Omnihedron

== See also ==
- Umbilicus (disambiguation)
- Axis mundi
- Axis mundi (disambiguation)
- Center of the World
