= Axis mundi (disambiguation) =

Axis mundi is the axis of the Earth between the celestial poles.

Axis mundi may also refer to:

- Axis Mundi: The Book of Spirits, a 1995 supplement for a role-playing game
- Axis Mundi (Decrepit Birth album), 2017
- Axis Mundi (Imminence album), 2026
- "Axis Mundi" (The Leftovers), a 2015 episode

== See also ==
- Navel of the World (disambiguation)
