= Mitad del Mundo =

Mitad del Mundo (Middle of the World) may refer to one of the following:

- Ciudad Mitad del Mundo, a national landmark located north of Quito, Ecuador
- Catequilla Arqueological Site, a prehispanic observatory at Pomasqui Valley Zone, Ecuador
- The Quitsato Sundial, located exactly on the equator, near Cayambe, Ecuador
