= Umbilicus urbis Romae =

Archaeological site in Rome, Italy

Coordinates: 41°53′33.82″N 12°29′4.44″E

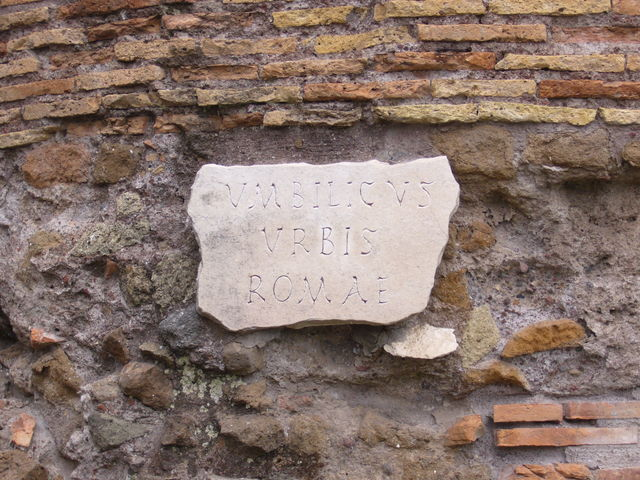
Plate marking the Umbilicus Urbis

The Umbilicus Urbis Romae (Classical Latin: [ʊmbɪˈliːkʊs ˈʊrbɪs ˈroːmae̯])—"Navel of the City of Rome"—was the symbolic centre of the city, a reference point from which, and to which, all distances in Ancient Rome were measured. It was situated in the Roman Forum, where its remnants can still be seen. These remains are located beside the Arch of Septimius Severus and the Vulcanal, behind the Rostra. Originally covered in marble, the Umbilicus is now a brick core some 2 metres high and 4.45 metres in diameter.

== History ==
Roman legend related that Romulus, when he founded the city, had a circular pit dug in the Forum. The first fruits of the year were thrown into this pit as a sacrifice, and all new citizens of Rome had to throw in a handful of dirt from their place of origin.

The Mundus (Latin, "world"), known only from literary sources, was an underground structure considered a gate to the underworld. It may be that the Umbilicus Urbis Romae was the external (above-ground) part of the subterranean Mundus. The Mundus was ritually opened only three times each year. These days were considered dies nefasti—days on which official transactions were forbidden on religious grounds—because evil spirits of the underworld were thought to escape then.

The original masonry Umbilicus was probably constructed in the 2nd century BC. The existing ruins, however, are from the time of the Emperor Septimius Severus. The construction of his triumphal arch in 203 AD encroached upon the ancient Umbilicus, which was recreated to allow more space. Fragments of the older monument were used in the new one.

The Umbilicus is believed to be a separate structure from the Milliarium Aureum, which was built nearby by Augustus (c. 20 BC) and served much the same purpose for distance reference.

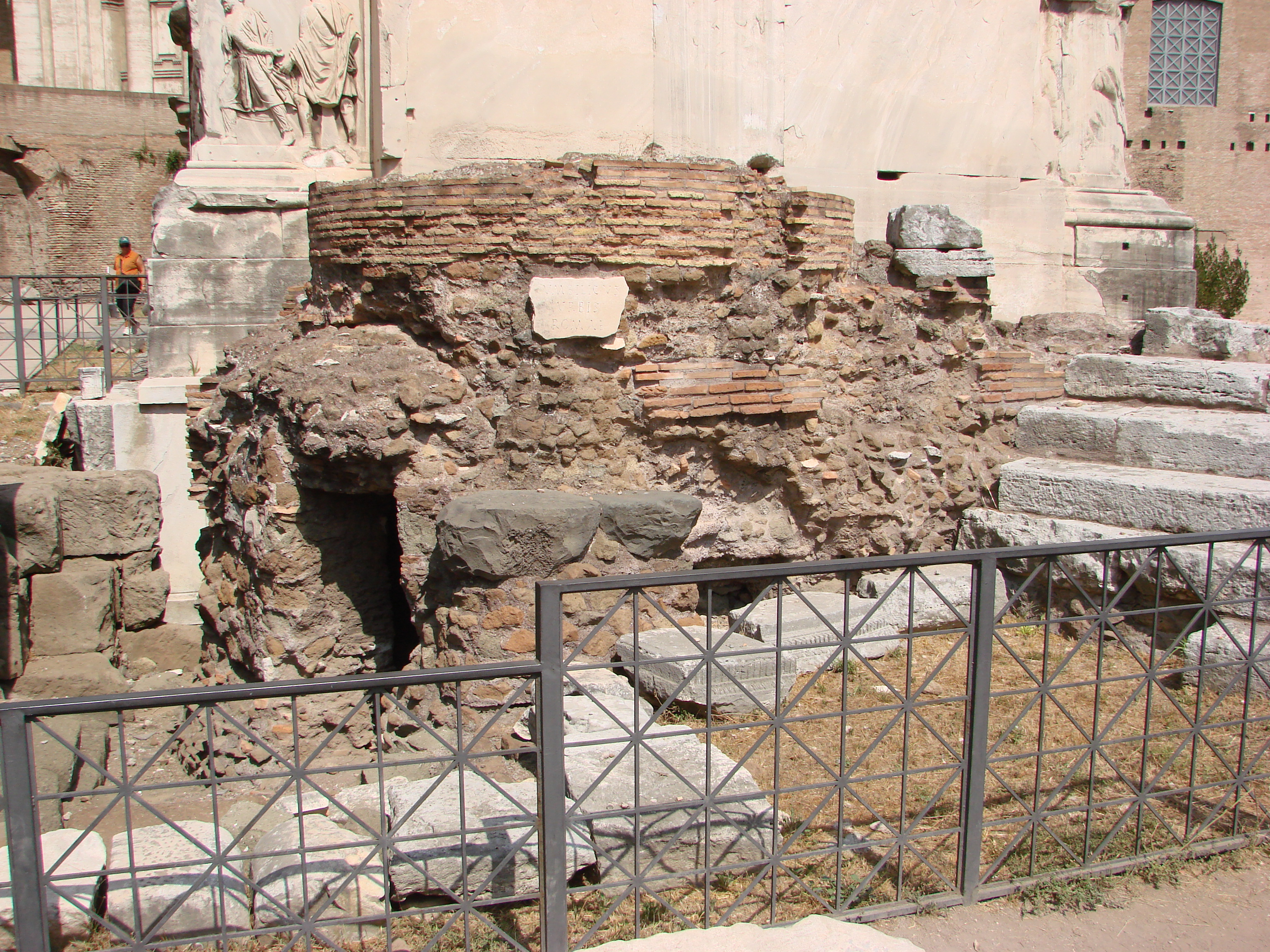

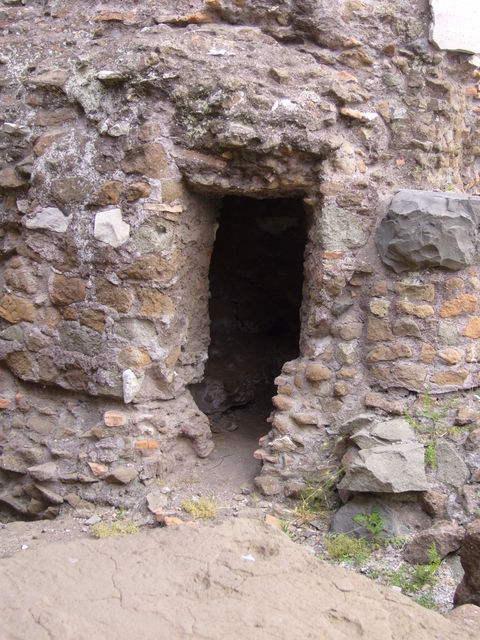
Entrance to the brick structure

== See also ==
- Mundus Cereris
- Milion of Constantinople
- Kilometre Zero
- Datum (geodesy)
