= Belly button (disambiguation) =

Belly button (or "bellybutton") is a colloquial term for the navel; as a proper noun, it may refer to:

- "Belly Button", a song from the Silly Songs with Larry segment of VeggieTales
- Bellybutton (album), the debut album from the band Jellyfish
- The Bellybuttons, a comic book series by the French-Canadian team Dubuc and Delaf

== See also ==
- Bellybutton Nautilus, a species of nautilus.
