= Center of Gravity (festival) =

Coordinates: 49.8840°N 119.5021°W

Center of Gravity Festival was an annual three-day sport and music festival held in Kelowna, British Columbia, at City Park on Okanagan Lake.

== Background ==
Center of Gravity was founded by Scott Emslie in 2008 and is organized by Kelowna-based production company Wet Ape Productions. The event features eight sports: beach volleyball, crossfit, basketball, wakeboarding, freestyle mountain biking, FMX, skateboarding, and BMX. The event has three stages of music playing various genres of electronic, hip hop and rock (although primarily electronic focused) throughout the days and nights.

In March 2020 the organisers announced the festival would not be returning.

In February 2019 the organisers had announced there would be a hiatus and the 2019 event wouldn't take place. In recent years there had been difficulties controlling the crowds. A teenager had died from a drug overdose at the 2018 event.

== Past events ==
=== 2018 ===
Taking place from July 27 to 29, the event was headlined by Wu-Tang Clan, Zedd, and French Montana.

=== 2014 ===
In 2014 the event moved from the long August weekend to a weekend in July. Despite attracting attendance of 7,000 per day the organisers lost money. The local authority urged Emslie to broaden the demographic and improve security.

=== 2011 ===
The 3-day festival brought in 25,000+ attendees. Showcased a variety of genres of music on 3 different stages.

- Main Stage: held a different concert each night, headliners included A-Trak, Calvin Harris, Chromeo, Classified, Dev and The Cataracs, and more.
- Beach Stage: an electronic dance stage located in a 1,000-person beverage garden, featuring artists such as LA Riots and Bad Boy Bill.
- Bass Stage: located under the trees in City Park and played mostly dubstep, drum and bass, and hip hop, featuring artists Mat the Alien, Downlink, Snak the Ripper and more.

Featured over 200 professional athletes in five different sports, as well as introduced the all-new sports zone the "Urban Zone".

=== 2010 ===
Established as one of the largest sport and entertainment festivals in western Canada, COG added Freestyle Moto Cross and Jet Ski racing to the sports action. There were two stages, Beach Stage and Main Stage. Headliners included Steve Aoki, Naughty by Nature, Dragonette, Karl Wolf and more.

=== 2009 ===
Basketball and wakeboarding were added to the sports line-up, and big-name Canadian artists Bif Naked, Kardinal Offishall, and Danny Fernandes performed on the Main Stage.

=== 2008 ===
First year as "Center of Gravity", the Dirt Zone was added to include Freestyle Mountain Bike riders in a dirt jump competition.

=== 2007 ===
Originally called "Volleyfest", it started as a professional beach volleyball tournament with local entertainment.
