= Groma (surveying) =

Principal Roman surveying instrument

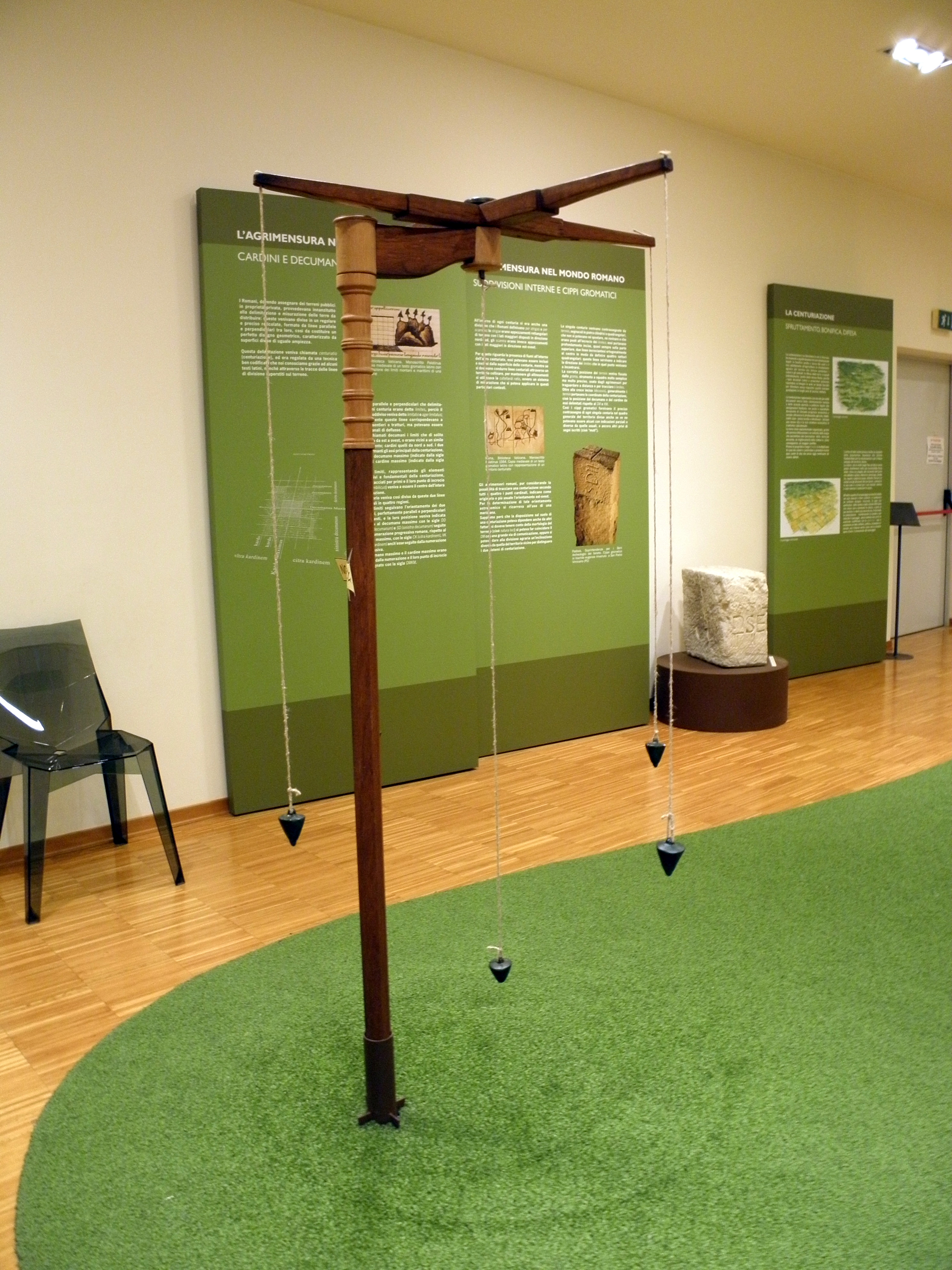
A groma

The groma (as standardized in the imperial Latin, sometimes croma, or gruma in the literature of the republican times) was a surveying instrument used in the Roman Empire. The groma allowed projecting right angles and straight lines and thus enabling the centuriation (setting up of a rectangular grid). It is the only Roman surveying tool with examples that survive to the present day.

== History ==
The name "groma" came to Latin from the Greek gnoma via the Etruscan language. It is unclear which of the many meanings of the Ancient Greek: γνώμων gnomon (cf. Liddell & Scott, "gnoma" is a form) was used, although in multiple sources the Greek term is used to designate the central point of a camp or town.

Dividing the land into rectangular plots was used by the Ancient Greeks, Egyptians and even Mesopotamians. However, the sheer scale of Roman centuriation from the 2nd century BC, when the new colonies were formed mostly to provide for veterans and landless citizens, was unprecedented, so it is not clear to what extent Greek practices influenced the Roman surveyors. The peculiarities of the Roman surveying methods and terminology suggest independence of Roman measurement tradition.

The groma may have originated in Mesopotamia or Greece before the 4th century BC. Subsequently, it was brought to Rome by the Etruscans and named cranema. There were apparently no improvements to groma introduced in Roman times: all writers on the subject clearly assumed the perfect familiarity of a reader with the tool.

== Construction ==
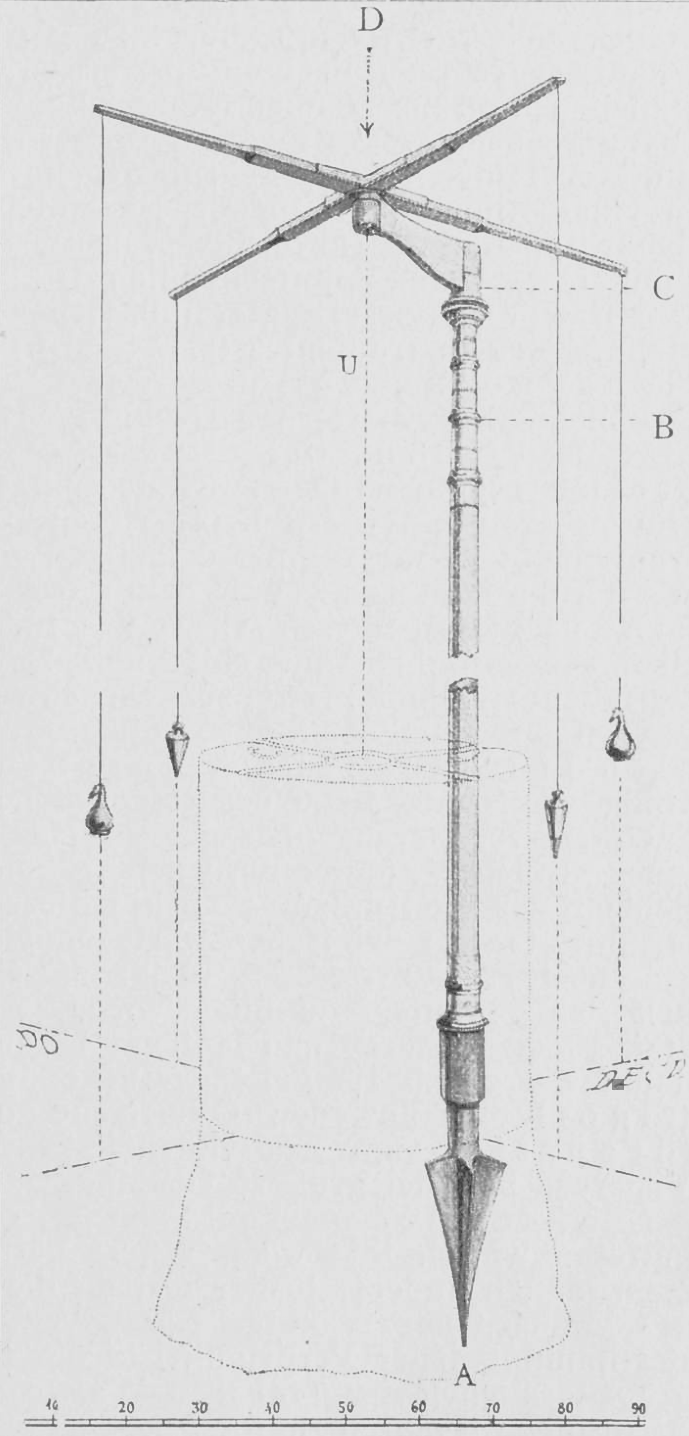
Groma. D points to the umbilicus soli

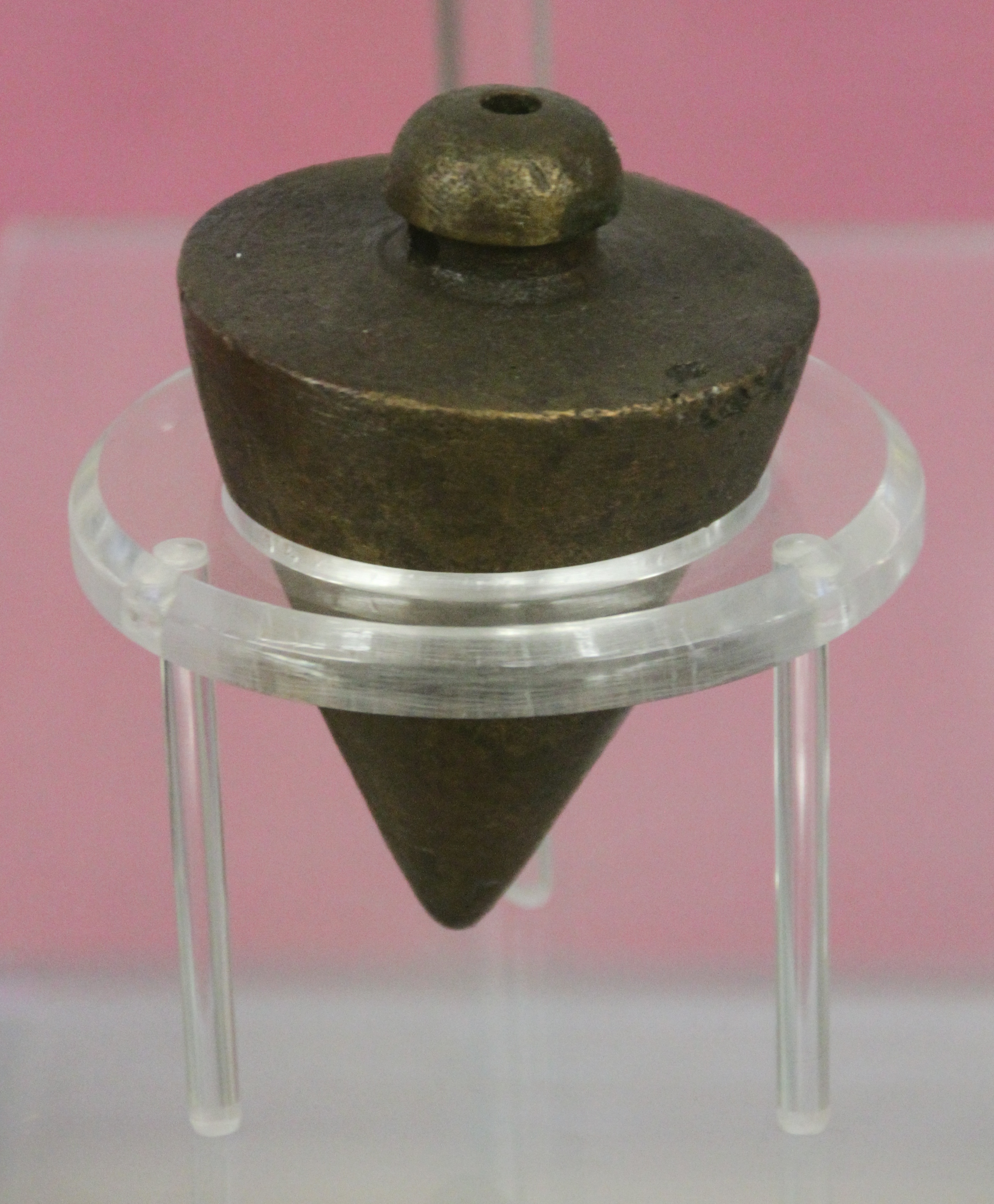
Close-up of a plumb bob

The tool utilizes a rotating horizontal cross with plumb bobs hanging down from all four ends. The center of the cross represents the umbilicus soli (reference point). The cross is mounted on a vertical Jacob's staff, or ferramentum. The umbilicus is offset with respect to the ferramentum by using a bracket pivoting on the top of the staff (frequently ferramentum is used to describe the whole tool). The purpose of offsetting the reference point from the Jacob's staff (vertical pole) is twofold: it enables sighting of lines on the ground through a pair of strings (used to suspend an opposite pair of plumbs from the cross) without the staff obscuring the view and allows placing the reference point over a sturdy object (like a boundary stone), where the staff cannot be inserted.

The pivoting bracket on the top of the staff was suggested in the 1912 reconstruction by Adolf Schulten and confirmed by Matteo Della Corte soon afterwards. However, as asserted by Thorkild Schiöler in 1994, the 5-kilogram cross found in Pompeii is too heavy to be supported in this way, thus the bracket had never existed. Furthermore, there is no archeological evidence of the bracket, and the images of gromas on tombstones do not show it. The archeologists rejecting the bracket suggest that the staff was slightly angled to permit sighting without the pole obscuring the view.

== Use ==
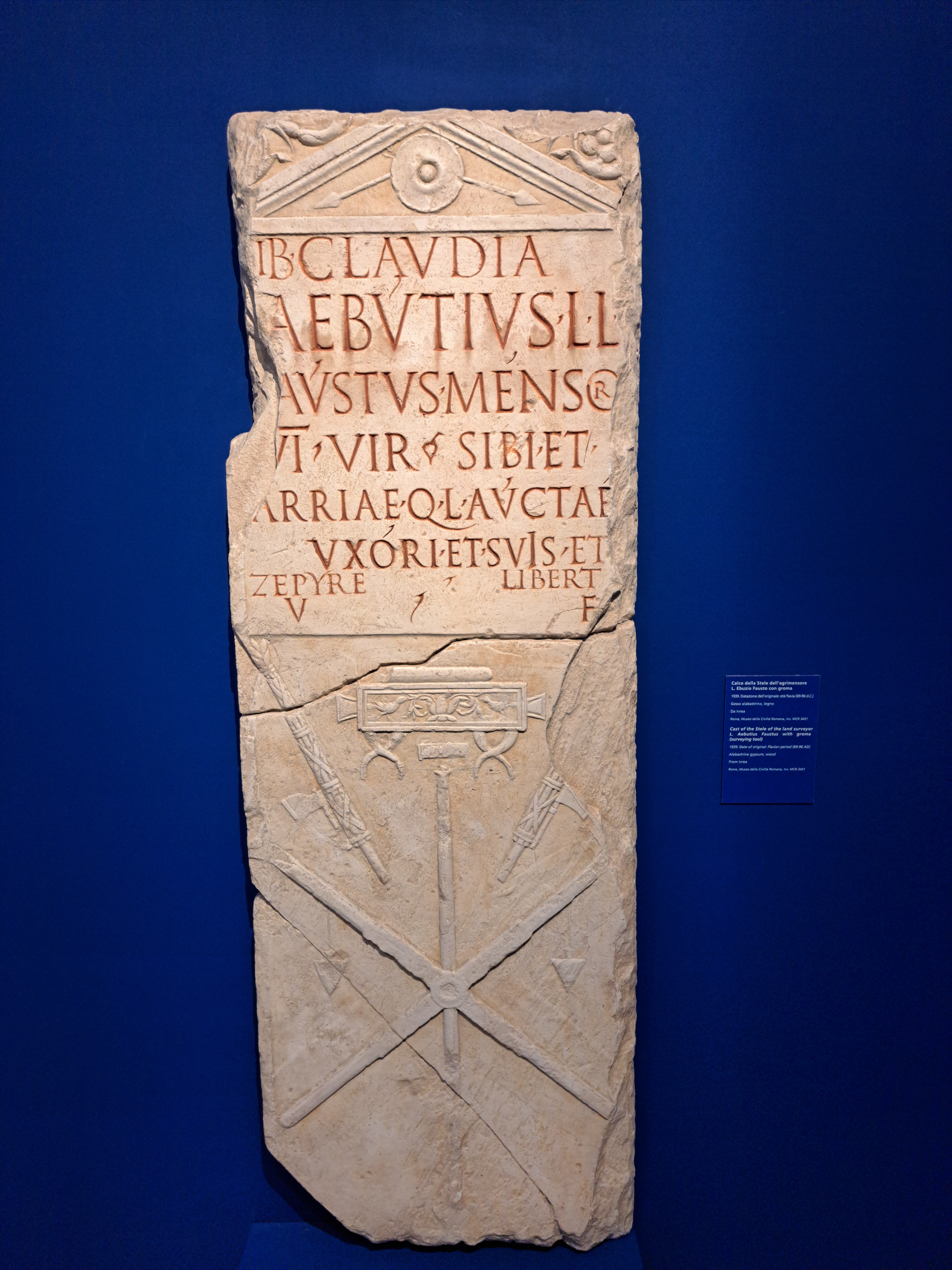
Cast of the stele of a land surveyor, Flavian period

Despite a great deal of surviving information about the groma (and the simplicity of the tool itself), the details of its operation are not entirely clear. The general idea is straightforward: the staff was inserted into the ground a bracket length away from the marker, and the bracket was then swung so that the umbilicus soli was directly on top of the center of the marker. The cross was then turned to align with the desired directions and the surveyor's assistant would step back and place a pole as directed by the surveyor (a gromaticus). The surveyor could then view the pole through two strings on the opposite ends of the cross.

The distances were measured using rods. The setup works on the level ground or gentle slopes; the details of a survey crossing a steep-sided valley are not clear.

The alignment of the plumb-lines of the groma is quite susceptible to wind. This compares unfavorably with dioptra. Also, the far plumb-line on the cross is optically thinner than the closer one, introducing the angle error calculated by the archeologists to be about 1.5 promille (linear error of about 1 meter per the side of centuria, 710 meters).

== Sources ==
- Lewis, M. J. T. (2001-04-23). "The groma". Surveying Instruments of Greece and Rome. Cambridge University Press. pp. 120–133. doi:10.1017/cbo9780511483035.008. ISBN 978-0-521-79297-4.
- Stone, Edward Noble (1928). "Roman Surveying Instruments". A Bibliography of Chaucer 1908–1924. University of Washington Publications: Language and Literature. Vol. 4. University of Washington Press. pp. 215–242.
- Russo, Flavio; Rossi, Cesare; Ceccarelli, Marco; Russo, Ferruccio (2009). "Devices for Distance and Time Measurement at the Time of the Roman Empire". International Symposium on History of Machines and Mechanisms: Proceedings of HMM 2008. History of Mechanism and Machine Science. Springer Netherlands. p. 107. ISBN 978-1-4020-9485-9.
- Kelsey, Francis W. (July 1926). "Groma by Matteo della Corte". Classical Philology. 21 (3). The University of Chicago Press: 259–262. doi:10.1086/360795. JSTOR 263160.
- Liddell, Henry George; Scott, Robert (1889). "γνώμων". An Intermediate Greek-English Lexicon. Oxford: Clarendon Press.
