= Umbilicus (reference point) =

Aspect of city planning used in ancient Rome

In a typical Roman city, an umbilicus (umbilicus urbis, "city navel") represented the reference point used by the city planners to map out the city spaces, including the pomerium, a sacred city boundary. The place for an umbilicus was supposedly set by examining the sky.

The standard city plan included two major thoroughfares, decumanus maximus and cardo maximus, intersecting at the umbilicus thus starting the centuriation (surveying). Umbilicus played an important spiritual role. Not only it symbolized the birth of a city; a mundus cerialis, an underground chamber dedicated to the underground gods, was dug next to it as a part of the breaking ground for the city. The Roman idea of an absolute and unchangeable center of the city is related to the beliefs that the city is a permanent dwelling of gods, with both the umbilicus and the pomerium predestined by the divine forces; even if the city was physically destroyed, it was not forsaken for as long as the deities remained.

The term umbilicus agri ("navel of the field") was used if the surveying was done for the agricultural land, frequently the same reference point was used for the city and the surrounding land.

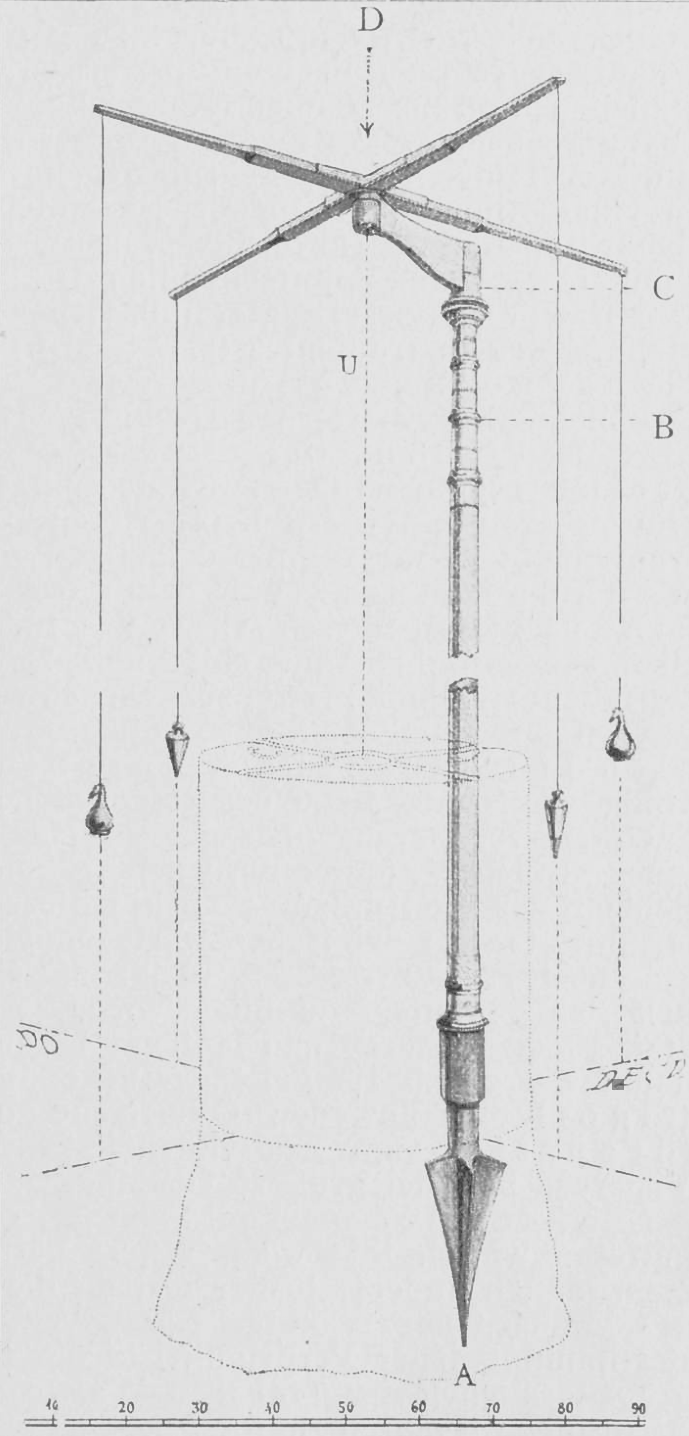
Groma. The umbilicus soli is located under the center of the cross (line D-U)

Umbilicus soli (the "ground navel") was the name for the reference point of the Roman surveying tool, the groma, located at the moving end of a swinging arm, with a plumb bob suspended underneath. The purpose of offsetting the reference point from the Jacob's staff (vertical pole) was twofold: it enabled sighting of lines on the ground through a pair of strings (used to suspend an opposite pair of plumbs from the cross) and allowed placing the reference point over a sturdy object (like a boundary stone), where the staff cannot be inserted.

== See also ==
- Omphalos

== Sources ==
- Sennett, R. (1996). "The creation of a Roman city". Flesh and Stone: The Body and the City in Western Civilization. W. W. Norton. ISBN 978-0-393-34650-3.
- Hsueh, Meng-chi (2016-03-31). "Horizontally Shifted and Vertically Superimposed Ancient Cities: Comparing Urban Histories of Chang'an and Rome" (PDF). Athens Journal of History. 2 (2). Athens Institute for Education and Research ATINER: 111–128. doi:10.30958/ajhis.2-2-3. ISSN 2407-9677.
- Starac, A. (2018). Hercules' Sanctuary in the Quarter of St Theodore, Pula. Archaeopress Roman Archaeology. Archaeopress Publishing Limited. ISBN 978-1-78491-874-3.
- Dilke, O. A. W. (October 1962). "The Roman Surveyors". Greece and Rome. 9 (2): 170–180. doi:10.1017/S0017383500020519. JSTOR 641816.
- Stone, Edward Noble (1928). "Roman Surveying Instruments". University of Washington Publications: Language and Literature. 4 (4). University of Washington Press: 215–242.
- "Groma". Brill's New Pauly. Brill. doi:10.1163/1574-9347_bnp_e428200.
- Lewis, M. J. T. (2001-04-23). "The groma". Surveying Instruments of Greece and Rome. Cambridge University Press. pp. 120–133. doi:10.1017/cbo9780511483035.008. ISBN 978-0-521-79297-4.
