= Civil basilica =

Large public building in ancient Rome and Greece

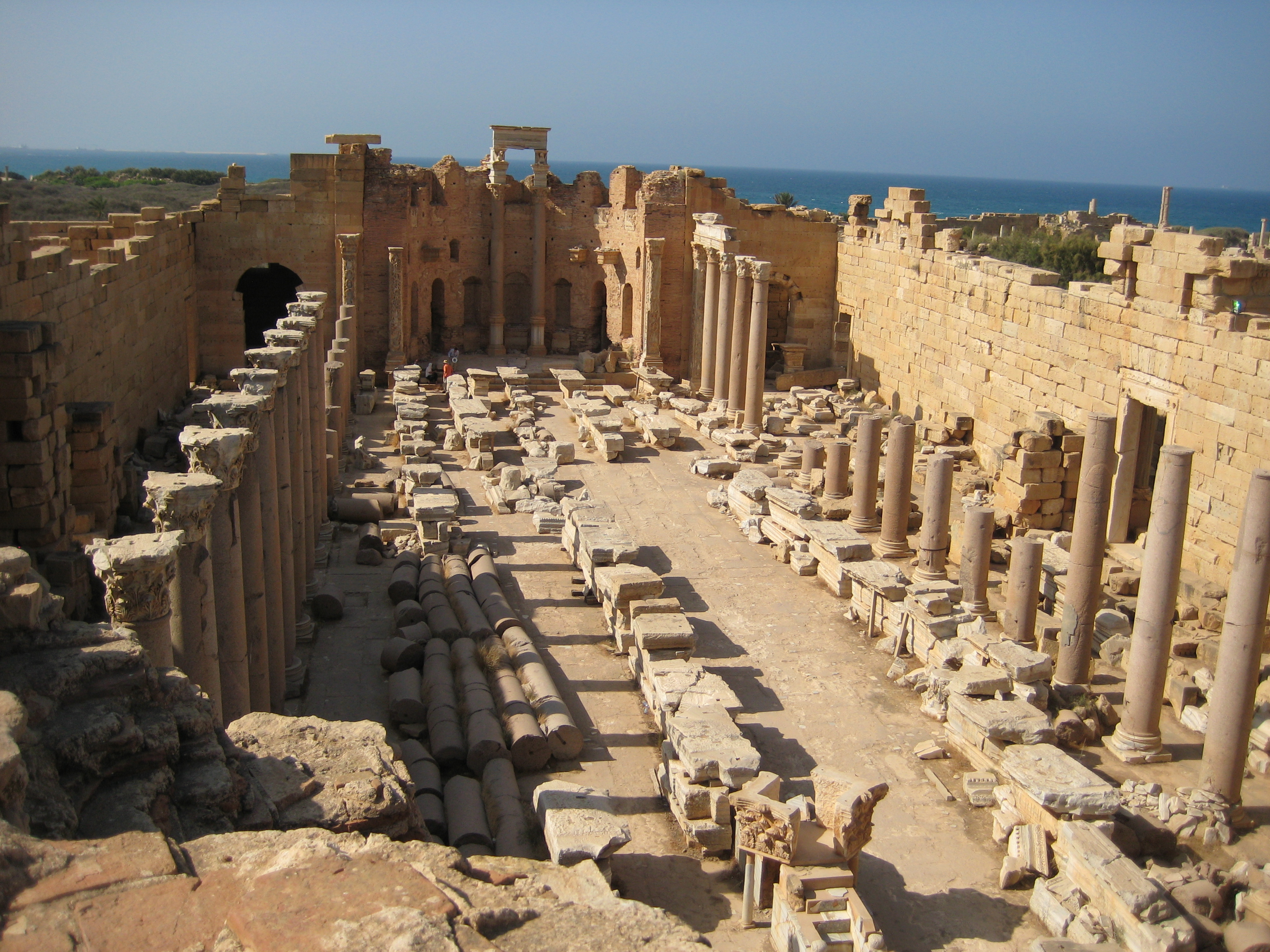
Basilica of the Severans at Leptis Magna

In antiquity, a civil basilica was a grand public building with a semi-sacred significance, serving a variety of purposes. These structures were commonly used for court hearings, public assemblies, and, at times, for commercial activities such as shops and financial transactions.

The architectural style of the basilica, known for its expansive covered space, originated in Ancient Greek architecture and was later adopted and enhanced in Roman architecture, becoming a distinctive feature of Roman cities.

Unlike Christian basilicas, ancient basilicas did not serve religious functions.

== Origins and etymology ==
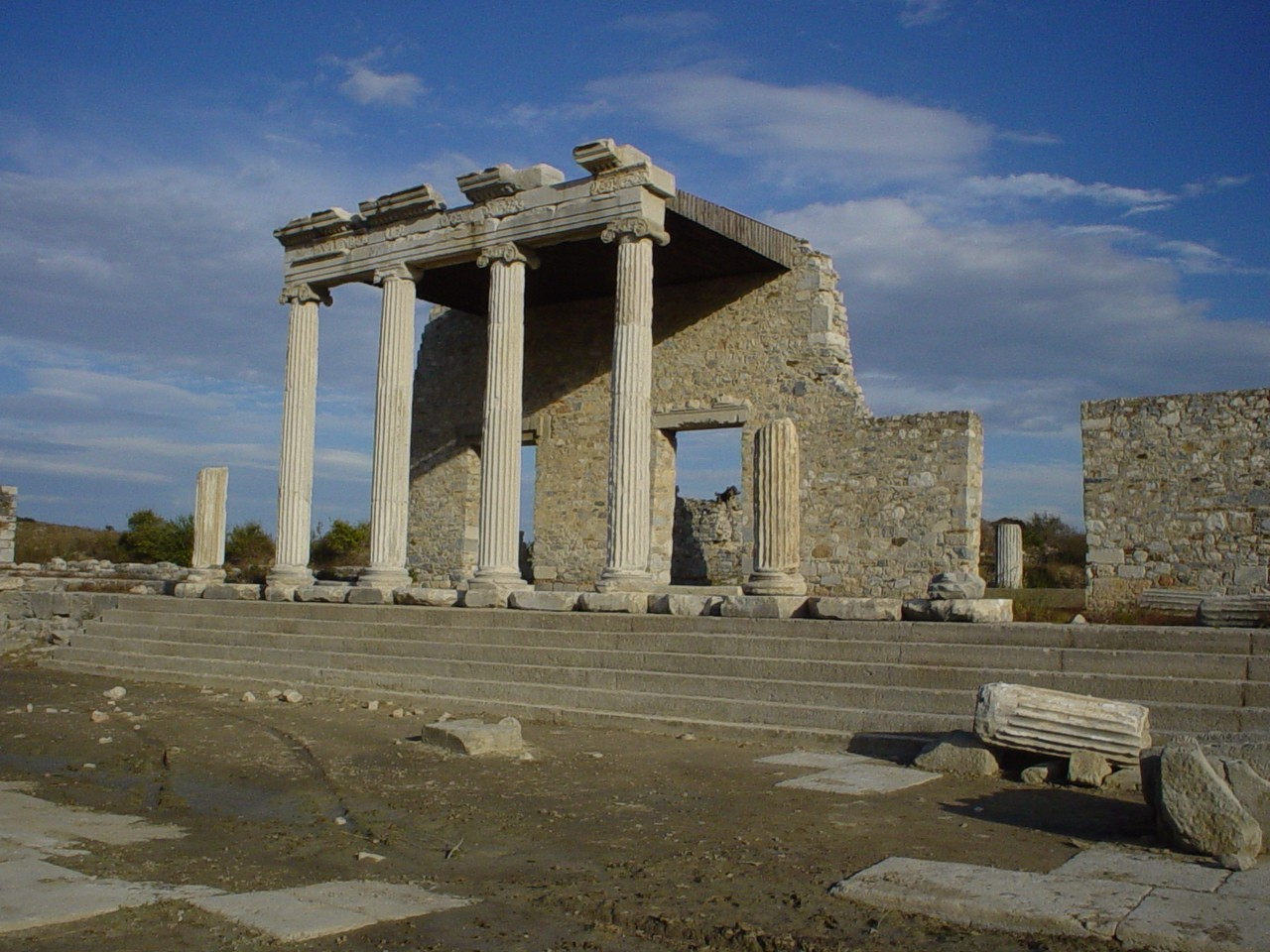
Ionic stoa along the Sacred Way of Miletus

The word "basilica" derived from the Latin term basilica, originates from two Greek elements: basileus, meaning "king", and the feminine adjective suffix -ikê. The full Greek expression is βασιλικά οἰκία (basilika oikia), which translates to "royal hall". This was traditionally a place where the king or his representatives would grant public audiences, dispense justice, and serve as a venue for public assemblies. The concept is related to the Greek stoa (στοά), a public covered space designed to shelter various activities from the weather. Over time, the stoa acquired a more specialized function, such as the stoa basileios in Athens, which served as the seat of the archon-king. These structures typically had an entrance enclosed at the back by a solid wall and opened onto the public space (the agora) at the front, featuring a portico with a colonnade.

== Roman Basilica ==
The Roman basilica, which emerged in the 2nd century BC, was inspired by and named after the Greek stoa basileios. The development of the Roman basilica followed a path similar to that of the Greek stoa. Initially designed as a public space providing shelter from the weather, the basilica evolved to serve specific functions, particularly in the administration of justice. All Roman basilicas were used for legal proceedings. For example, in Rome, the tribunes of the plebs held their hearings in the Basilica Porcia, while the Centumvirs court met in the Basilica Julia. By the early 2nd century BC, this type of building, which provided a spacious and sheltered open area, became a significant feature in Roman cities, with most courts across the Empire utilizing it.

Every well-developed Roman city had a basilica, typically situated next to the forum. Some basilicas were associated with shops (tabernae), which opened either onto the exterior (as seen with the Basilica Aemilia, or tabernae novae) or onto the interior (as seen with the Basilica Julia). These shops may have been used by bankers and pawnbrokers.

=== Typical plan ===
The typical floor plan of a Roman basilica is rectangular, with at least one end featuring an apse, a semi-circular or polygonal recess often used as a court or to house a statue of the Roman emperor. A basilica with an apse at each end is known as a double-apse basilica. The apses, or exedras, may be incorporated within the rectangular plan or extended outward, as seen in the Basilica Ulpia.

The interior of a basilica is divided into multiple naves by rows of single or double columns. The central nave, known as the spatium medium, is the widest and extends nearly the full length of the rectangular plan. It is flanked by side naves—one on each side for basilicas with three naves, or two on each side for those with five naves. These side naves are narrower, and sometimes lower, than the central nave but are of equal length. The interior space may be covered by either a wooden framed ceiling or a vaulted ceiling supported by pillars. The central nave is typically taller than the side naves, allowing for the installation of windows in the upper part of the walls, which provides natural light to the interior. In larger basilicas, the ground floor arcade is often complemented by a second or even a third level of colonnades that support the windowed walls. The side naves are sometimes topped with an additional story, creating a gallery that overlooks the central space.

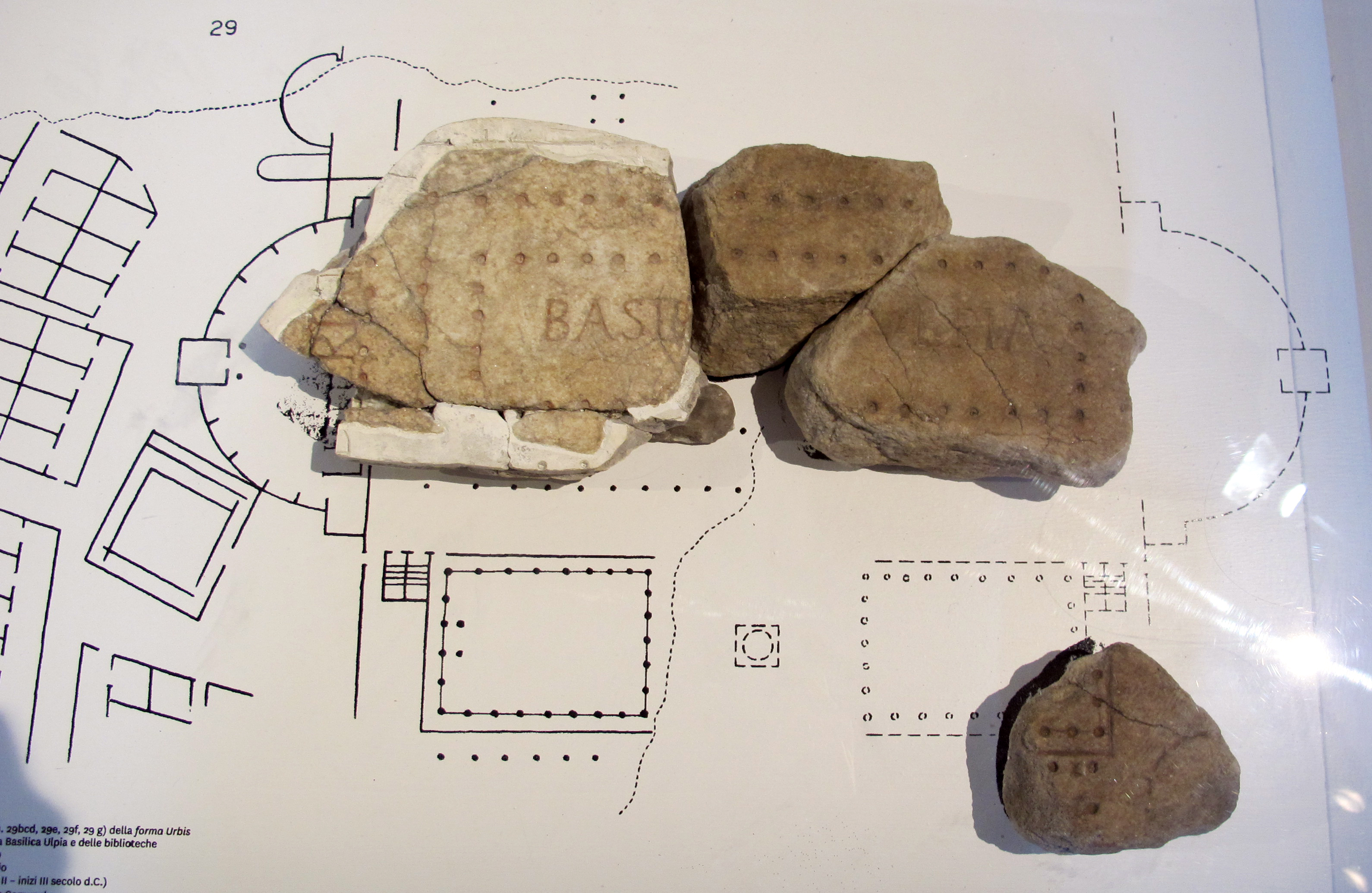
Plan of Basilica Ulpia on the Forma Urbis.

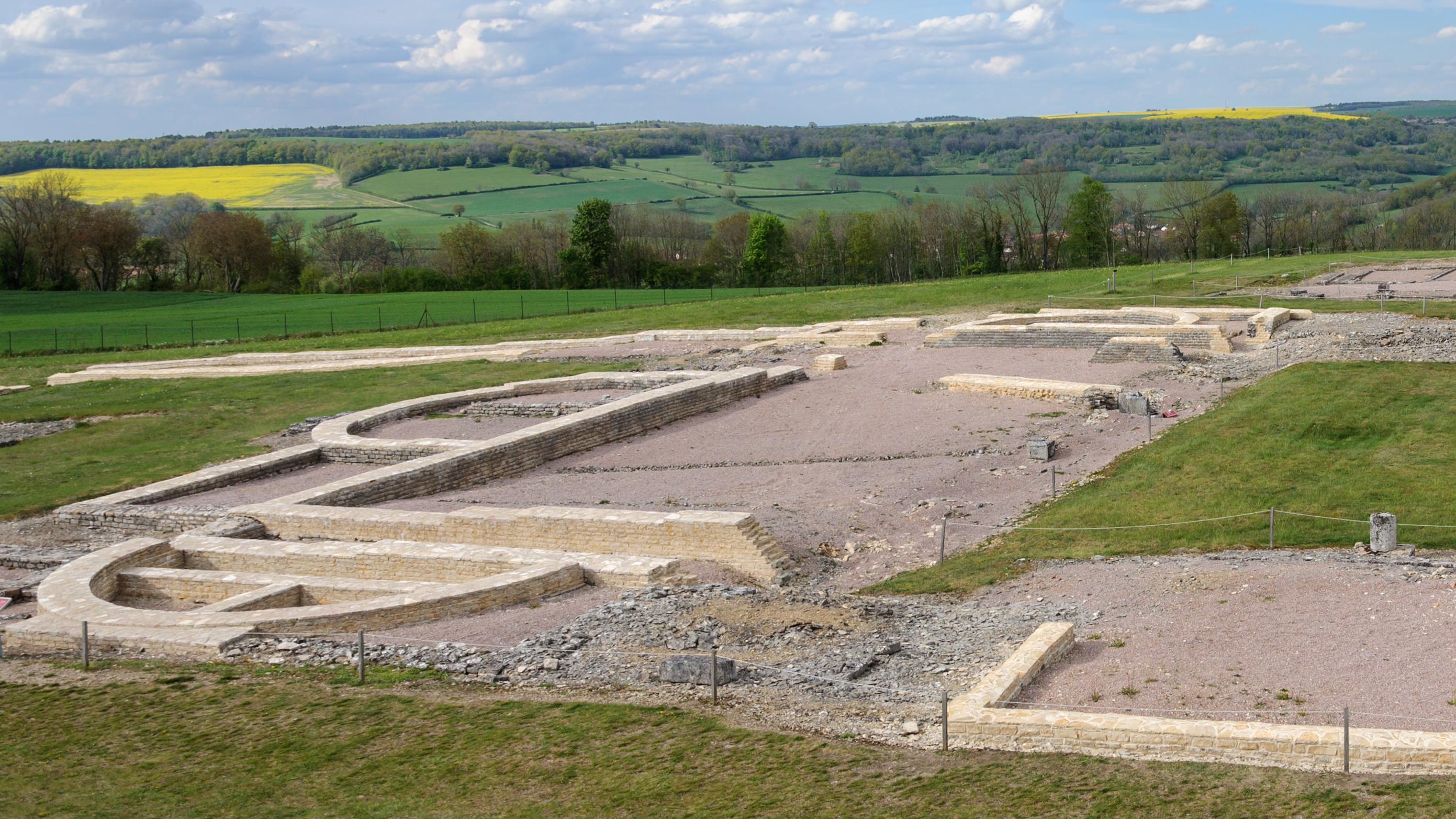
Civil basilica on the Alesia archaeological site. The remains of the walls show the layout of the building.

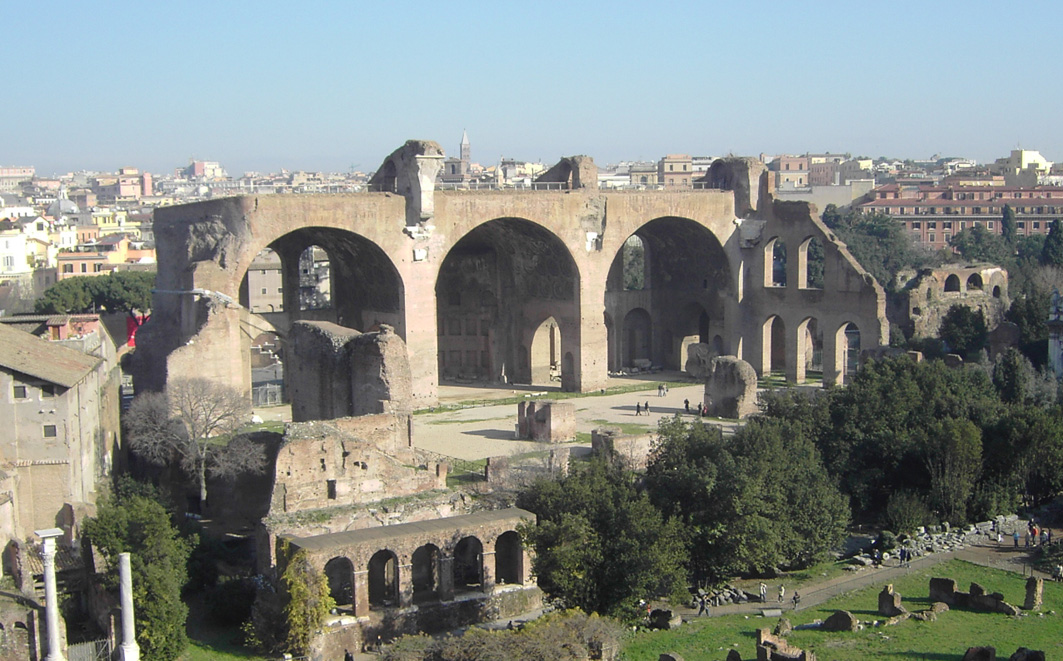
Basilica of Maxentius and Constantine in Rome, built between the Roman Forum and the Colosseum in the early 4th century.

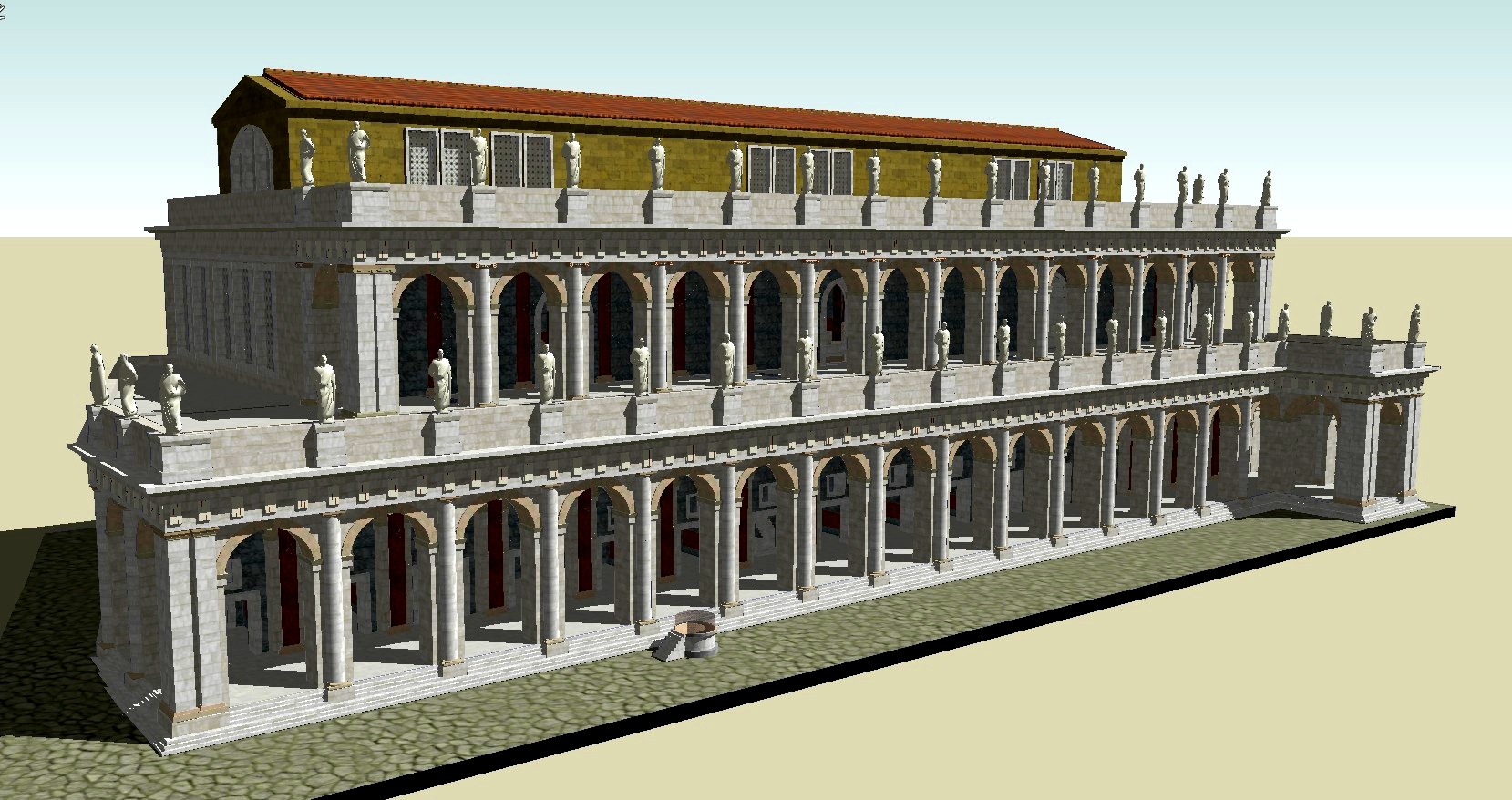
Computer generated image of the Basilica Aemilia

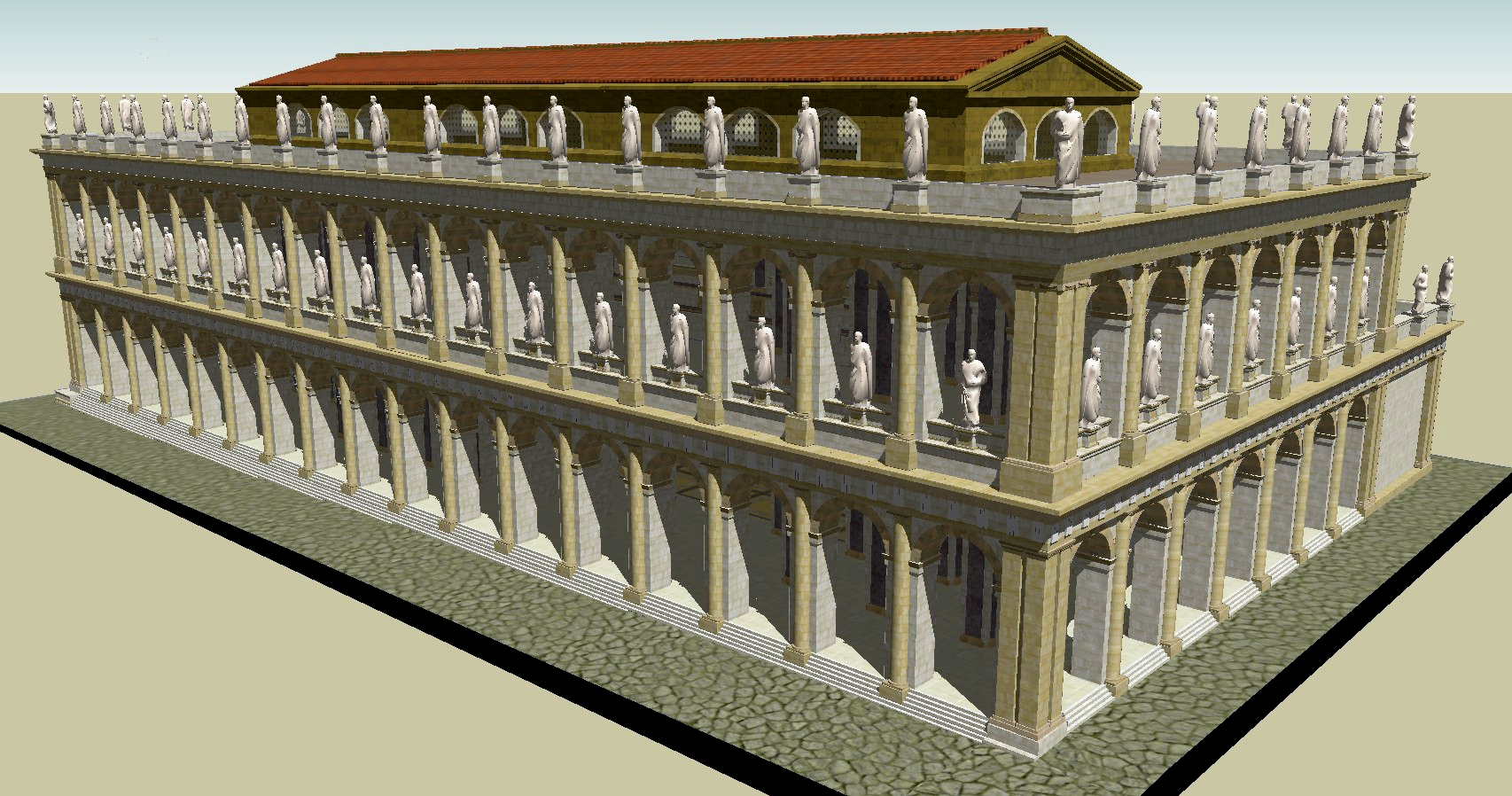
Computer generated image of the Basilica Julia

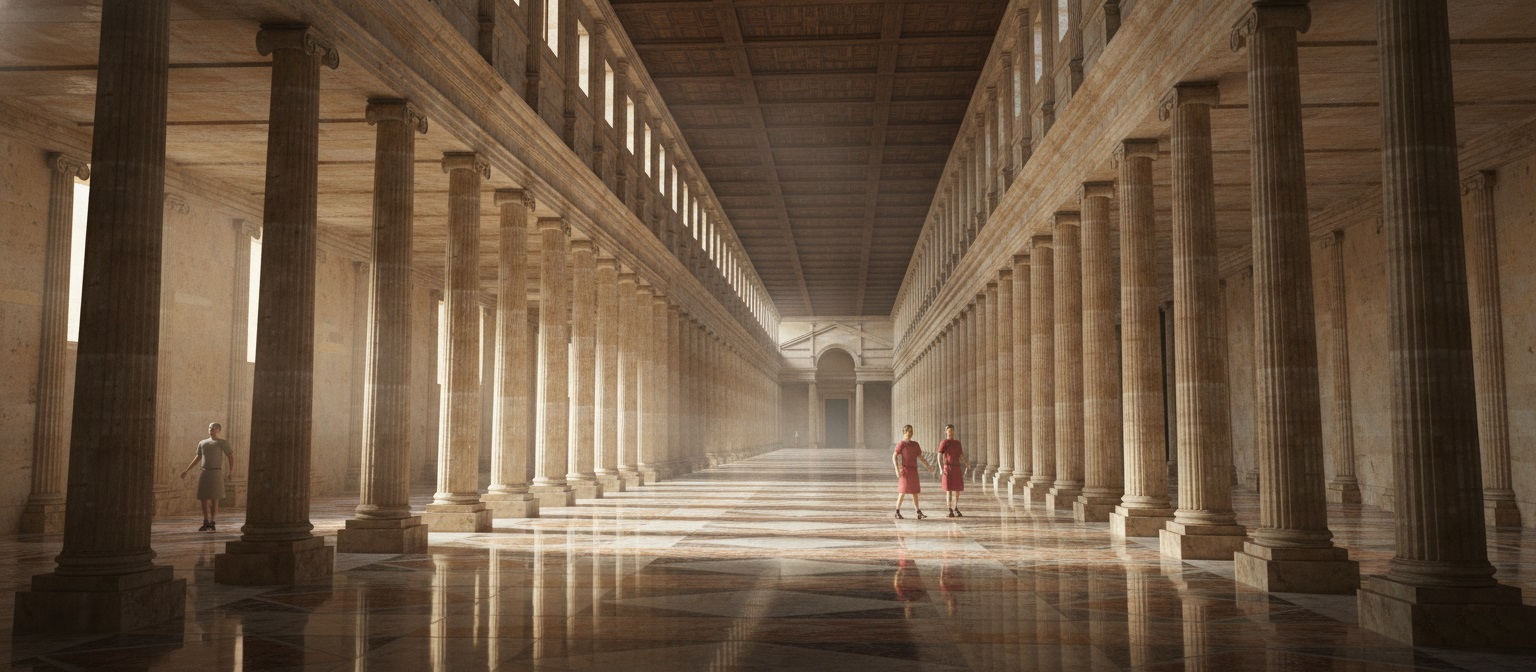
Restitution of the Civil Basilica of Aphrodisias (Turkey, late 1st century, modified in the 3rd century).

=== Basilicas in Rome ===
The initial basilicas constructed in Rome during the 2nd century BC were influenced by Greek architectural models, reflecting the impact of Roman campaigns in Macedonia and Syria. The first small basilica was built on the Roman Forum, later occupied by the southern section of the Basilica Aemilia. This earliest structure, dating from the end of the 3rd century BC, is not specifically named but is referred to as a basilica by ancient authors.

Between 184 and 170 BC, the Porcia, Aemilia, and Sempronia basilicas were constructed around the Forum, each named after the censor who commissioned its construction. These basilicas were adorned with various artworks obtained from conquered territories. By the mid-5th century AD, Polemius Silvius listed eleven basilicas in Rome:

Selection of basilicas in Ancient Rome
Names	Dates	Locations	Sponsors
Basilica Aemilia	179 BC	Roman Forum	Marcus Aemilius Lepidus and Marcus Fulvius Nobilior
Basilica Alexandrina	Around 230 AD	Campus Martius	Marcus Aurelius Severus Alexander
Basilica Argentaria	113 AD	Imperial fora	Trajan
Basilica Hilariania	Around 150 AD	Caelian Hill	Poplicius Hilarus
Basilica Julia	46 BC	Roman Forum	Julius Caesar and then Augustus
Basilica of Junius Bassus	331 AD	Esquiline Hill	Junius Bassus (consul)
Basilica Matidiae and Marcianae	120 AD	Campus Martius	Hadrian
Basilica of Maxentius	Around 310 AD	Velian Hill	Maxentius and then Constantine the Great
Basilica of Neptune	25 BC	Campus Martius	Marcus Vipsanius Agrippa
Basilica Opimia	121 BC	Roman Forum	Lucius Opimius
Basilica Porcia	184 BC	Roman Forum	Cato the Elder
Basilica Sempronia	170 BC	Roman Forum	Tiberius Sempronius Gracchus (consul 177 BC)
Basilica Ulpia	112 AD	Imperial fora	Trajan

== Christian basilicas ==
The floor plan of the Roman civil basilica served as a model for the construction of the first Christian churches in late Antiquity. This influence is evident in the continued use of the term "basilica" to designate certain churches from the time of Constantine onward. Today, the term "basilica" is still used for religious buildings of significant importance that, while not functioning as cathedrals, are granted special privileges.
