= Triforium =

Space inside a tall building

A Romanesque triforium gallery, Cathedral of Saint Mary Major, Lisbon

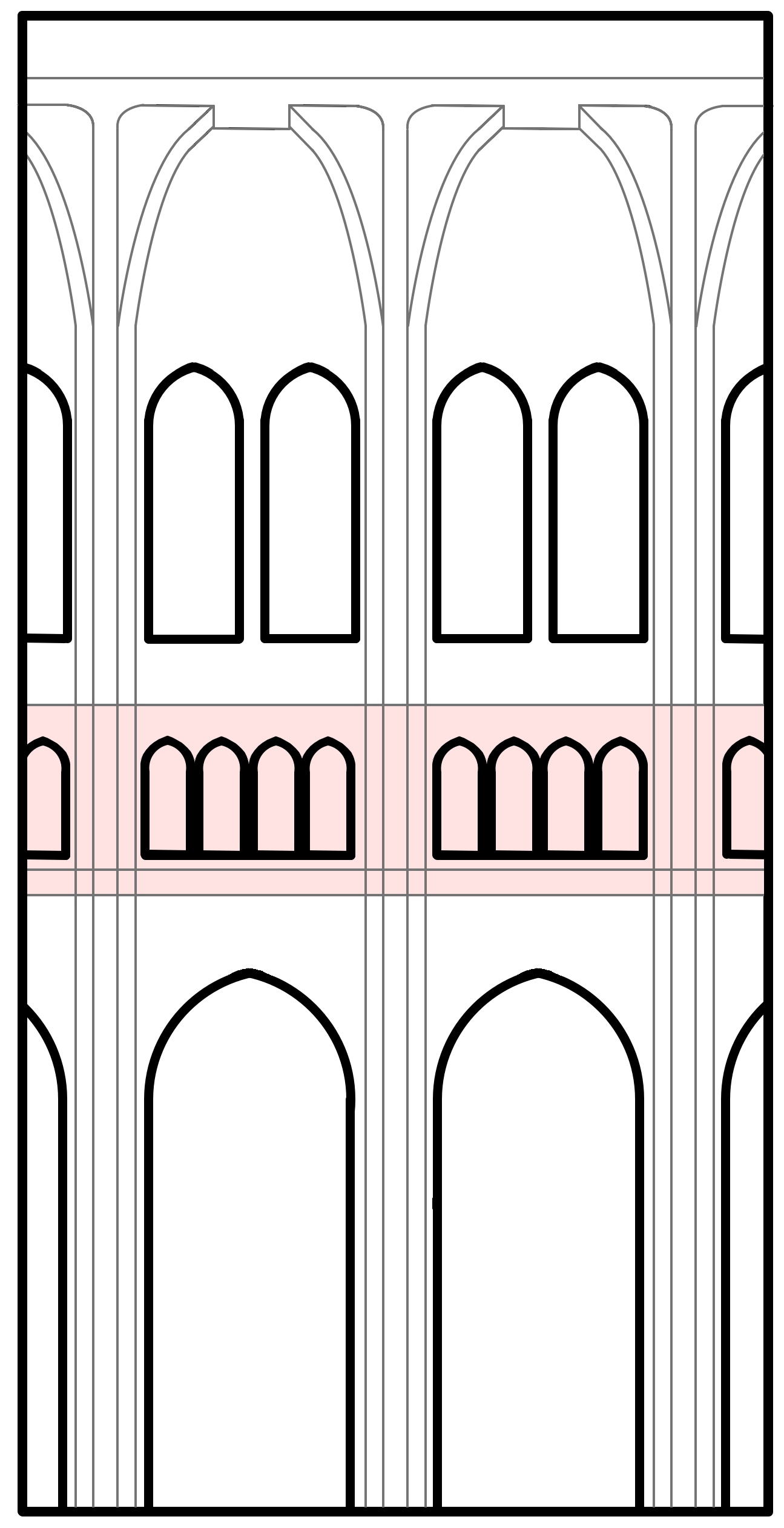
Interior elevation view of a three-storey Gothic cathedral, with triforium highlighted

A triforium is an interior gallery, opening onto the tall central space of a building at an upper level. In a church, it opens onto the nave from above the side aisles; it may occur at the level of the clerestory windows, or it may be located as a separate level below the clerestory. Masonry triforia are generally vaulted and separated from the central space by arcades. Early triforia were often wide and spacious, but later ones tend to be shallow, within the thickness of an inner wall, and may be blind arcades not wide enough to walk along. The outer wall of the triforium may itself have windows (glazed or unglazed openings), or it may be solid stone. A narrow triforium may also be called a "blind-storey", and looks like a row of window frames.

== History ==
Triforium is derived from the Latin tres, tria 'three' and foris 'door, entrance'; its Greek equivalent is τρίθυρον, which originally referred to a building with three doors.

The earliest examples of triforia are those in the pagan basilicas, where a triforium constituted an upper gallery for conversation and business; in the early Christian basilicas such a passageway was usually reserved for women, and the same applied to those in the Eastern Orthodox Church.

In Romanesque and Gothic buildings it is either a spacious gallery over the side aisles or is reduced to a simple passage in the thickness of the walls; in either case it forms an important architectural division in the nave of the cathedral or church, and being of less height gives more importance to the ground storey or nave arcade. In consequence of its lesser height its bay was usually divided into two arches, which were again subdivided into two smaller arches and these subdivisions increased the apparent scale of the aisle below and the clerestory above.

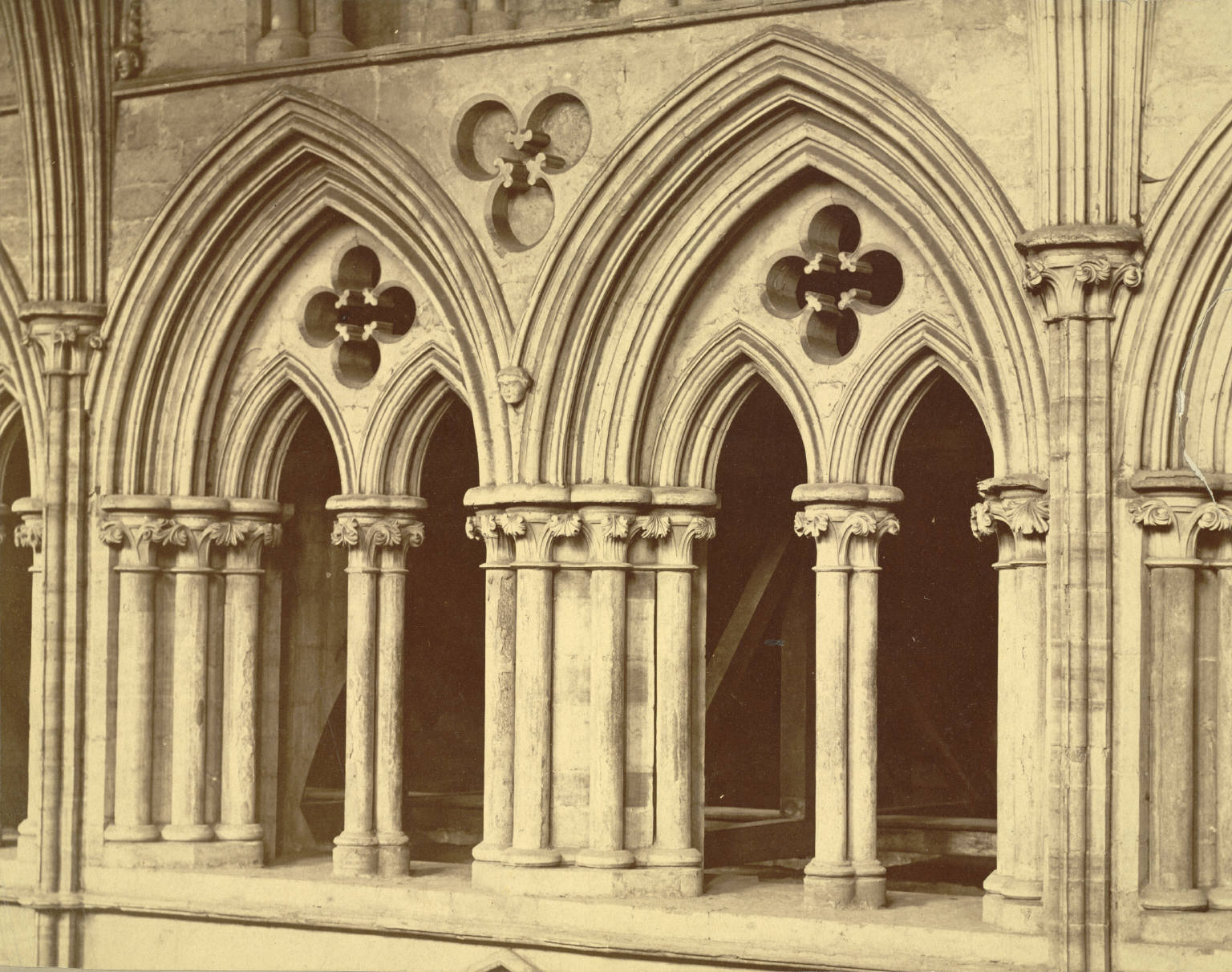
The triforium at Lincoln

On account of the richness of its mouldings and carved ornament in the sculpture introduced in the spandrels, it became the most highly decorated feature of the interior. The triforium at Lincoln has been described as one of the most beautiful compositions of English Gothic architecture. Even when reduced to a simple passage it was always a highly enriched feature. In the 15th-century churches in England, when the roof over the aisles was comparatively flat, more height being required for the clerestory windows, the triforium was dispensed with altogether. In the great cathedrals and abbeys the triforium was often occupied by persons who came to witness various ceremonies, and in early days was probably used by the monks and clergy for work connected with the church.

The triforium sometimes served structural functions, as under its roof are arches and vaults which carry thrust from the nave to the outer wall. When the flying buttress was frankly adopted by the Gothic architect and emphasized by its architectural design as an important feature, other cross-arches were introduced under the roof to strengthen it.

== Matroneum ==
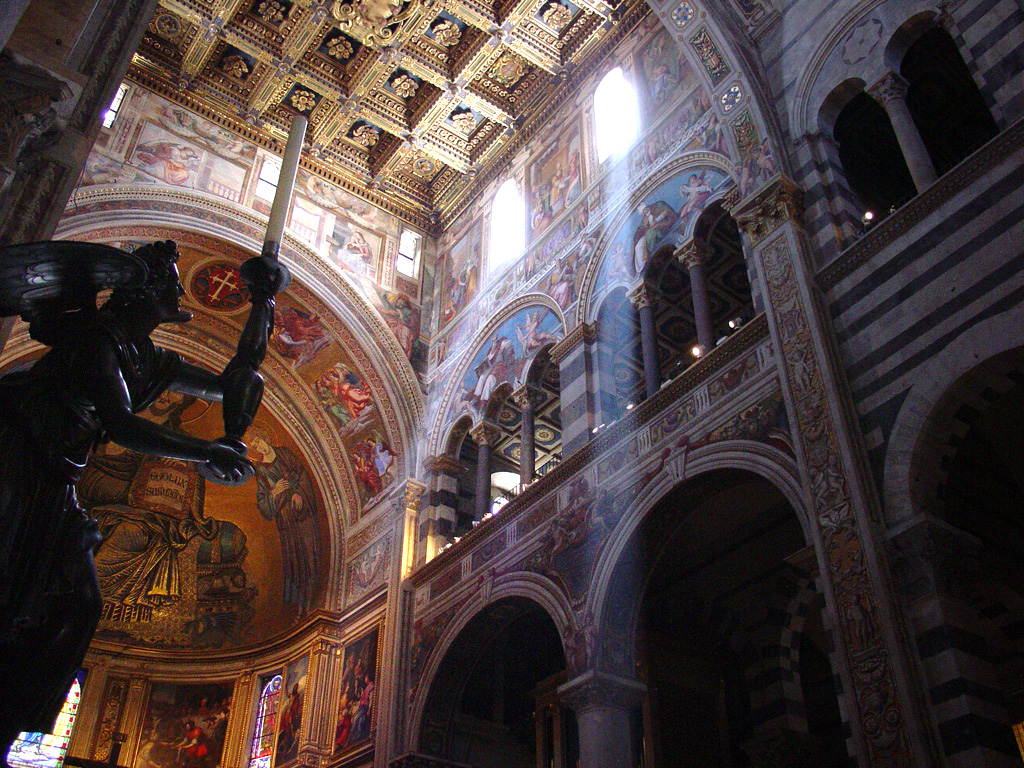
The matroneum of Pisa Cathedral protected by triforia and bifora

A matroneum (plural: matronea; earlier also matronaeum, plural matronaea) in architecture is a gallery on the interior of a building. Derived from the Classical gynecaeum (Greek: γυναικαίον, romanized: gynaikaion), it is traditionally understood as a space to accommodate women. However, this definition is disputed by Valerio Ascani, professor of the history of medieval art at the University of Pisa: according to Ascani, matronea were in fact intended for all persons who could not, or did not want to, enter the main body of the church below, including men as well as women, although the sexes were always separated to left and right.

Over time, the matroneum gradually lost its original social function. However, it continued to feature in medieval churches as a distinct architectural element placed over the side aisles that flanked the central nave. Also known as a tribune, this raised gallery sometimes also played a structural role by buttressing against the lateral forces exerted by the vault of the nave. Some Early Gothic cathedrals in France featured a four-storey internal elevation, in which the matroneum or tribune referred to the wider, more spacious gallery directly above the aisle, while the triforium was the narrower (sometimes blind) level between tribune and clerestory. However, this fell out of fashion in the succeeding periods of Gothic architecture, which instead favoured the simpler three-tier elevation of aisle–triforium–clerestory.

== Gallery ==
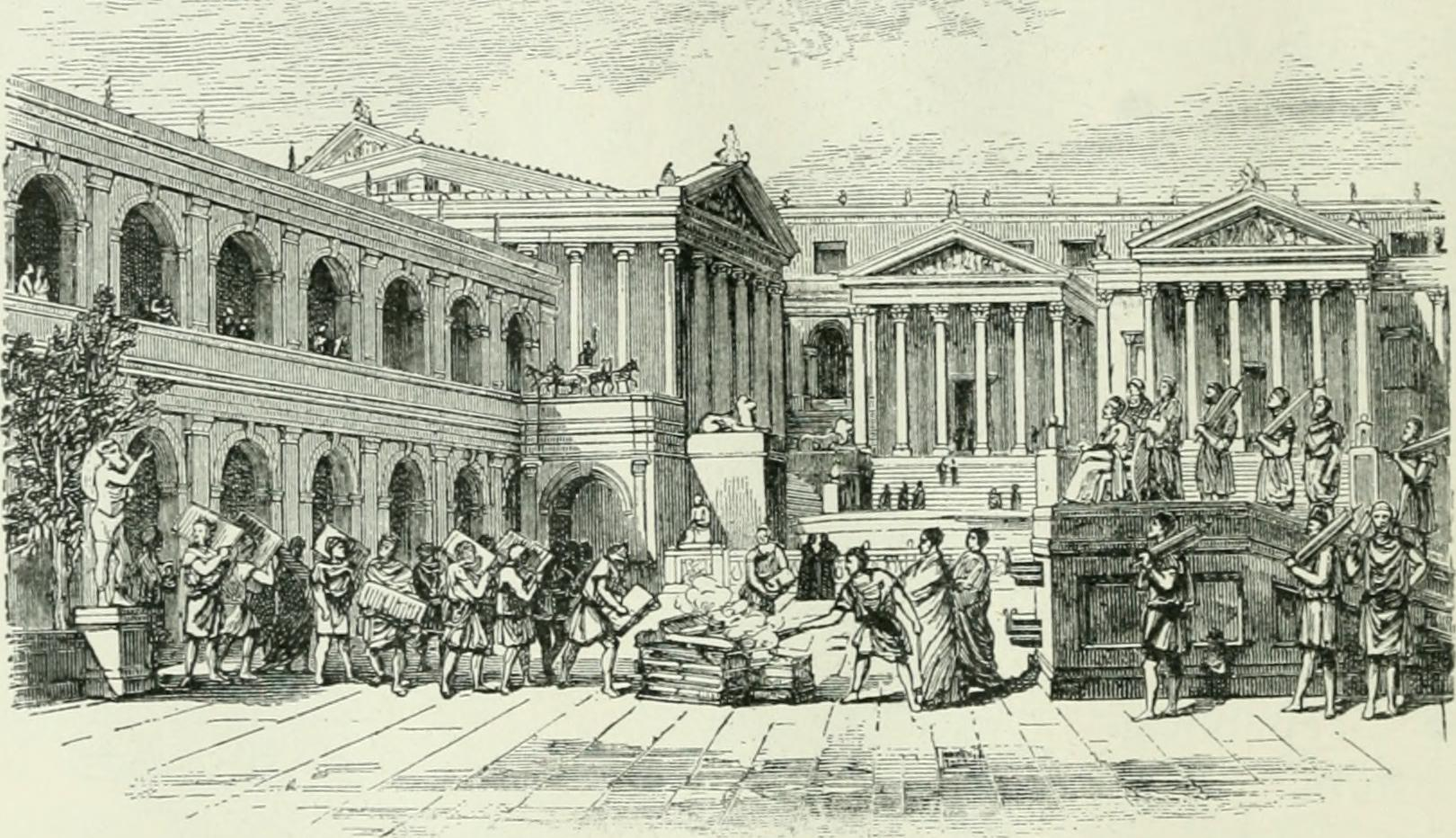
The Roman forum; note people looking out from the triforium of the Basilica Julia, above left. The arches on both sides of the basilica's triforium were unglazed.

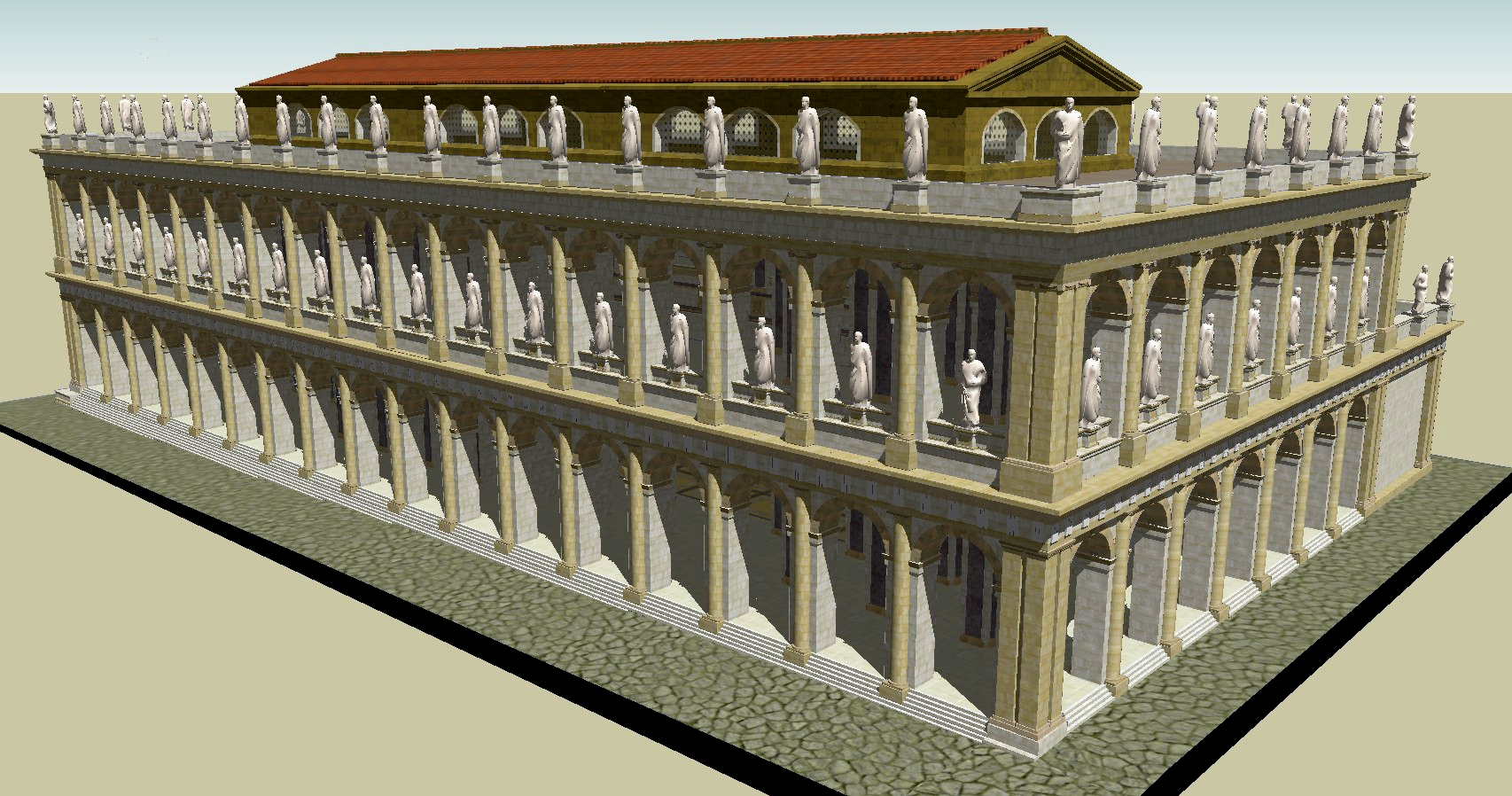
Model of the Basilica Julia, showing triforium as an upper-story arcade around a full-height central hall

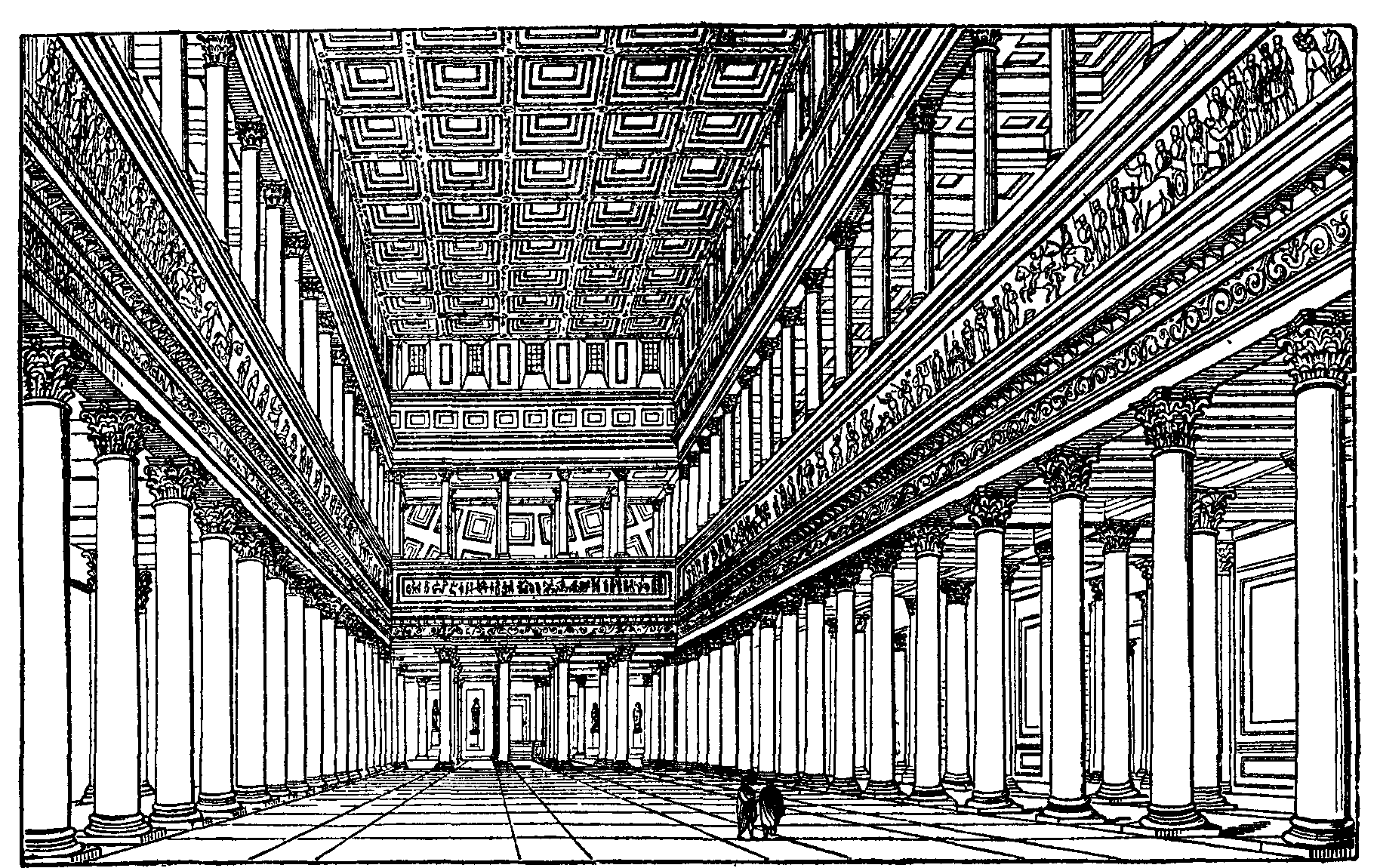
Interior of the Basilica Ulpia, architectural reconstruction. In use, the basilica would have contained law courts, banking, and a covered marketplace.
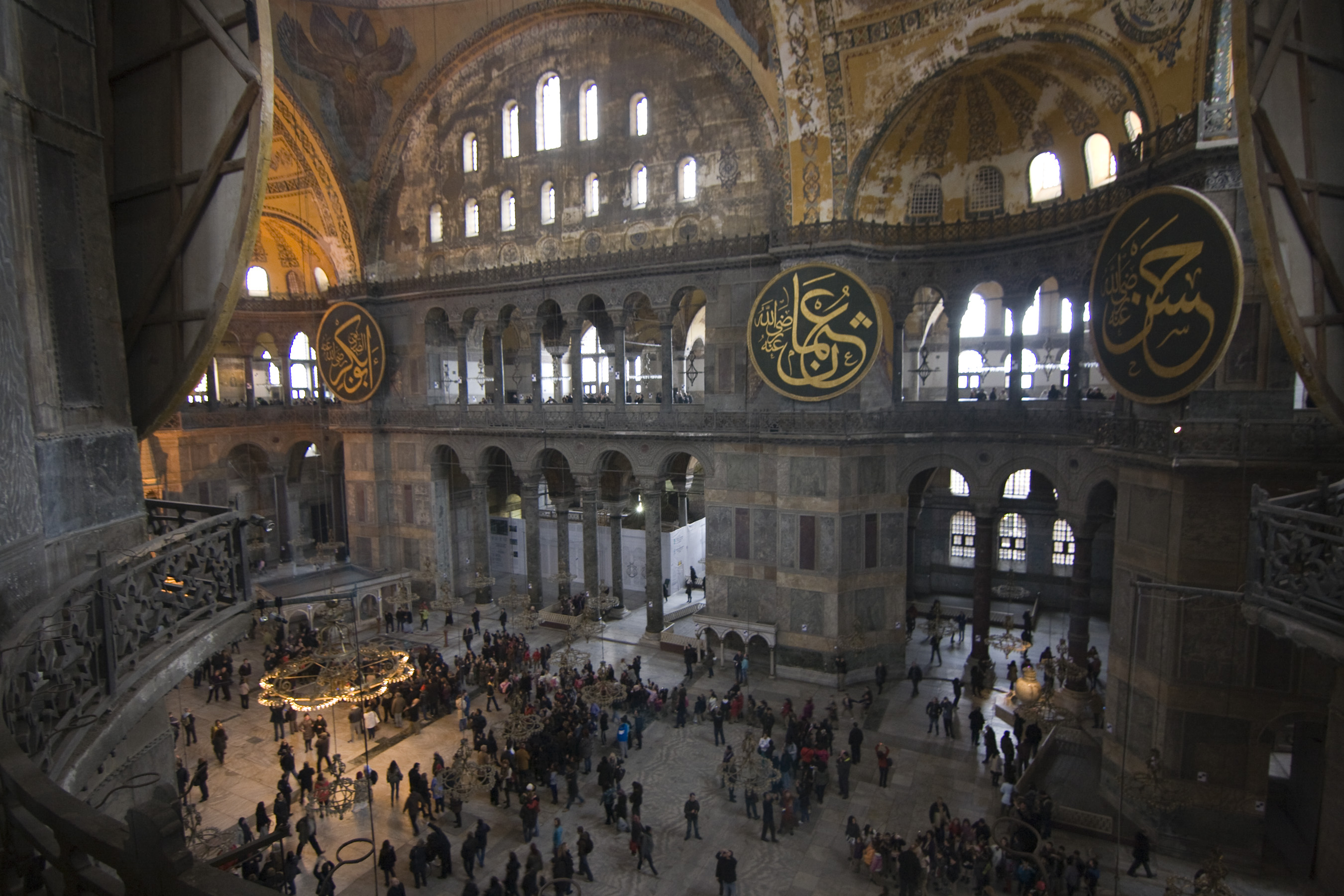
Interior of the domed 6th-century Hagia Sophia, with a wide triforium gallery beneath the rows of clerestory and upper dome windows.

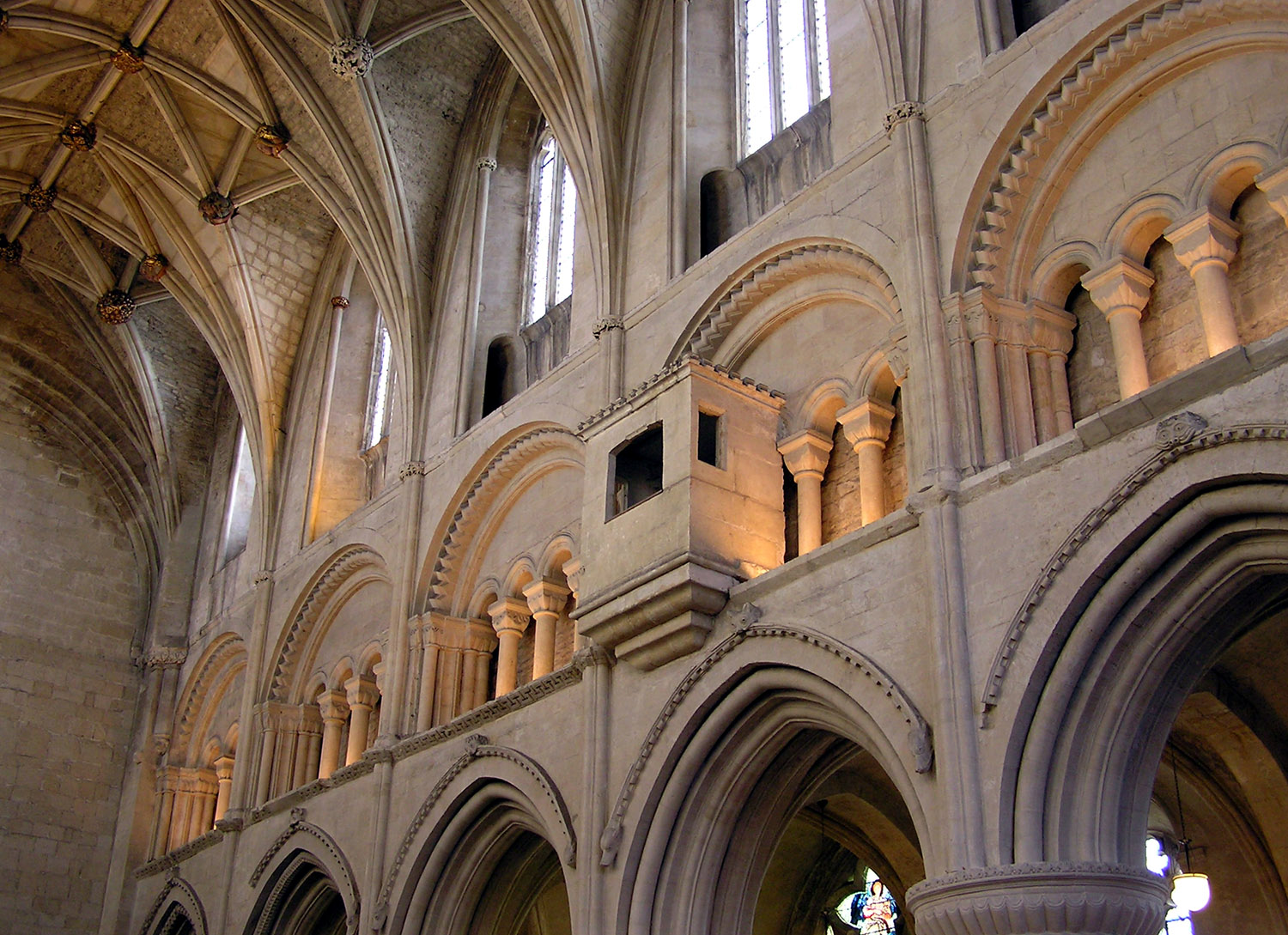
The Norman Malmesbury Abbey, showing the triforium, with its rounded arches and chevron mouldings, each arch supported by four small arches on columns. This triforium contains an unusual projecting watching-loft. There is also another passage above, at the base of the clerestory windows. Malmesbury, Wiltshire, England

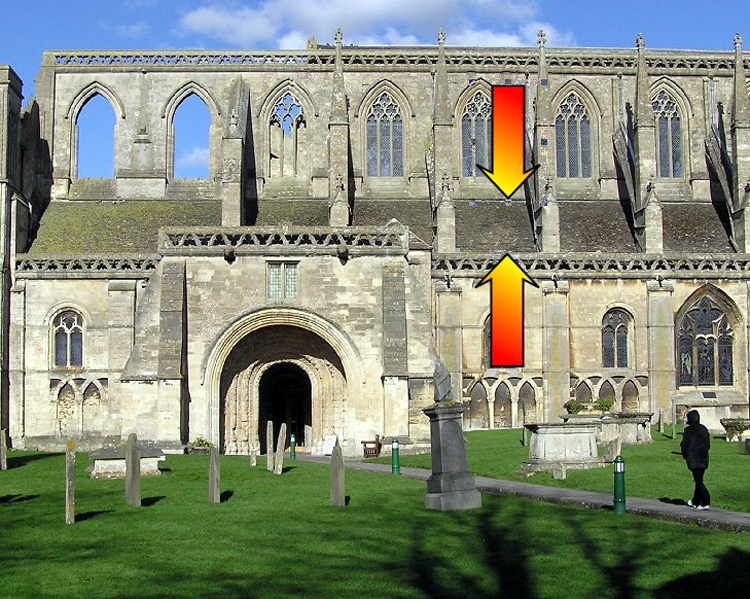
Malmesbury Abbey, showing the location of the triforium. It lies between the lower (aisle) windows and the upper (clerestory) windows, as arrowed. It is shallow, as it is inside the roofspace of the side aisles.

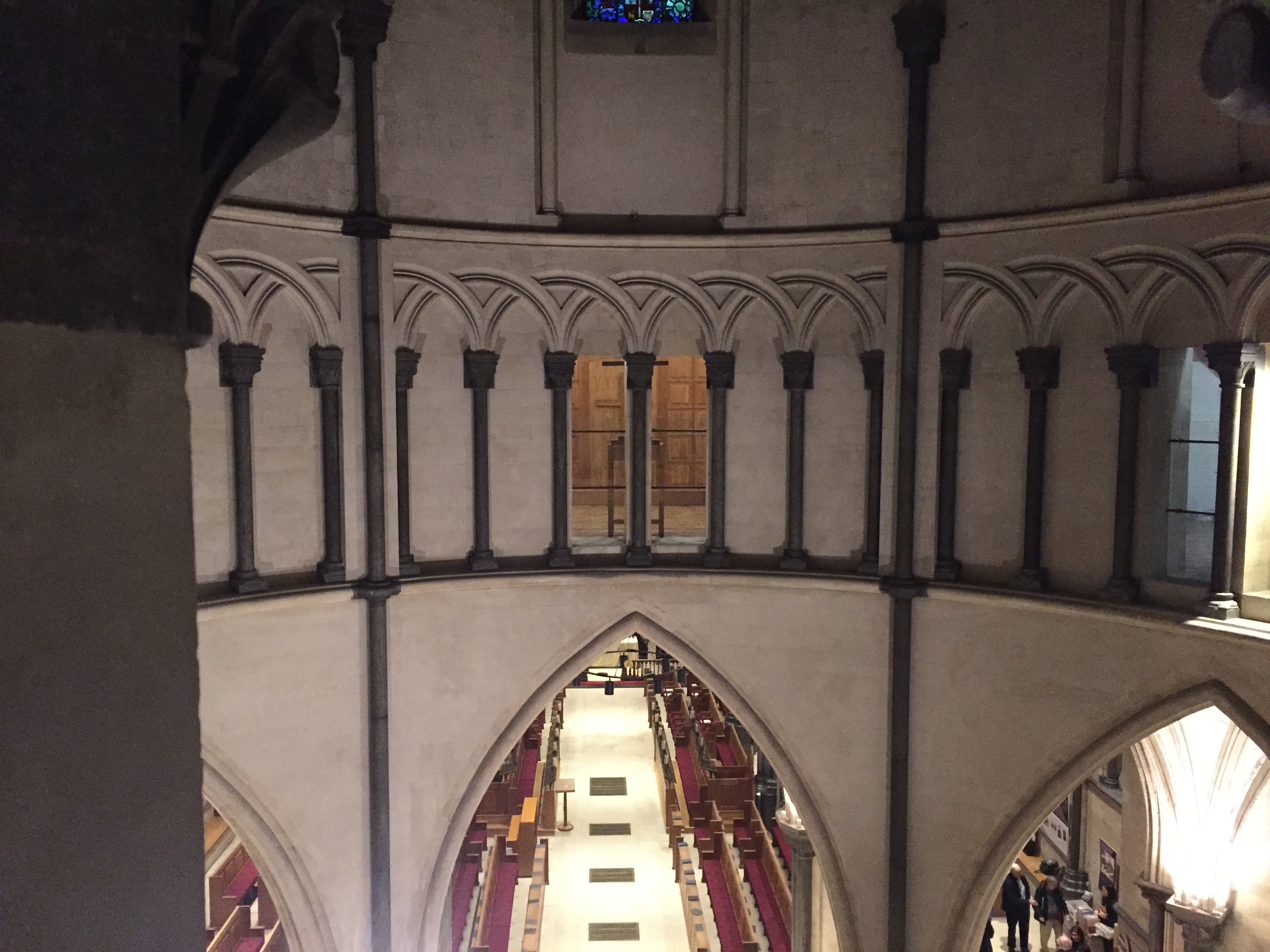
View of (and from) the circular triforium in the round church of the Temple Church in London. Built by the Knights Templar and consecrated in 1185.
A cross-section of a similar building, with a narrow triforium no wider than the wall

In contrast, the triforium of the early Gothic Notre-Dame de Paris has windows on the outside wall, and is the same width as the innermost side aisle arcade below (details).

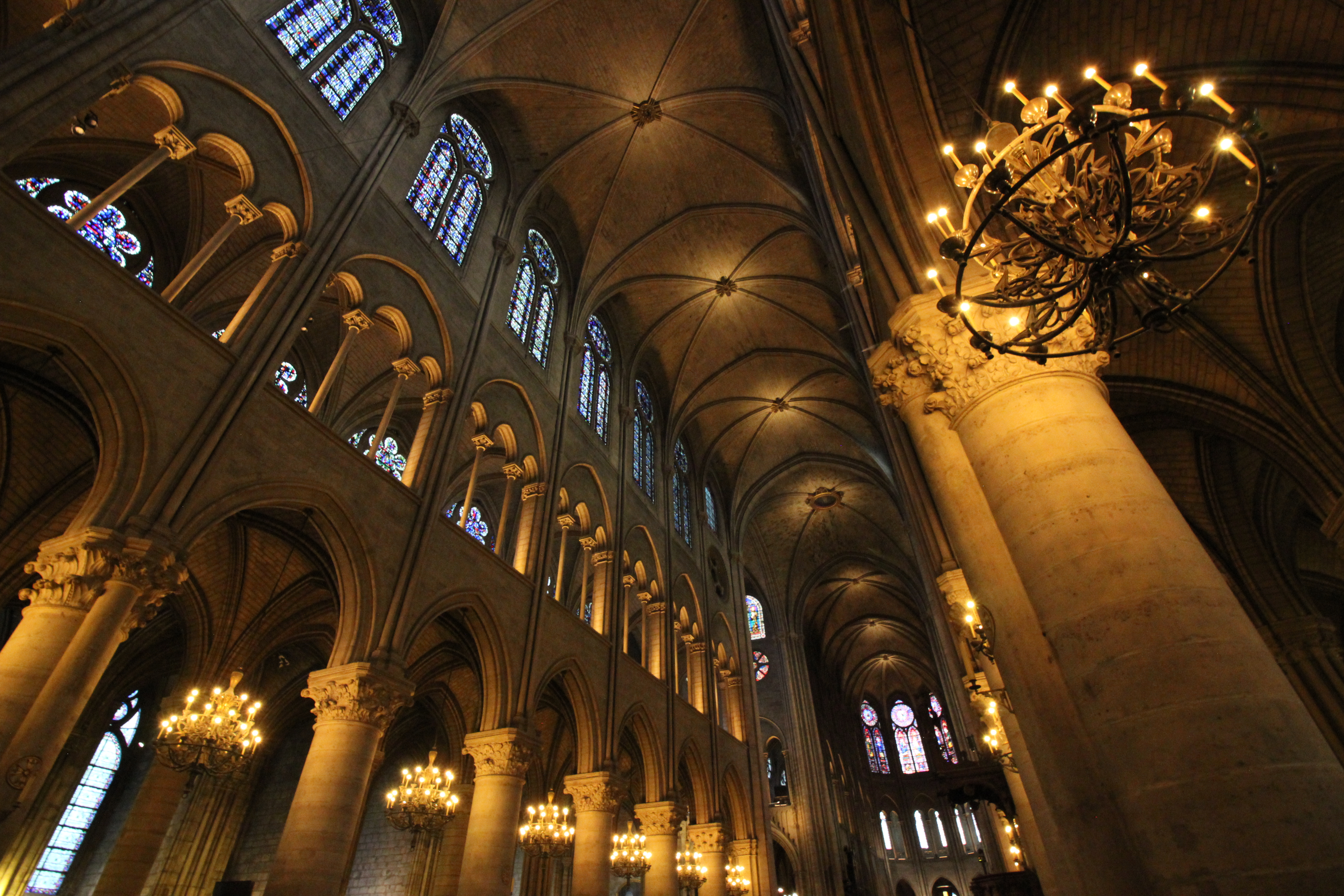
Interior view of Notre-Dame's nave wall, showing (top to bottom) clerestory window, triforium, and side aisle openings.

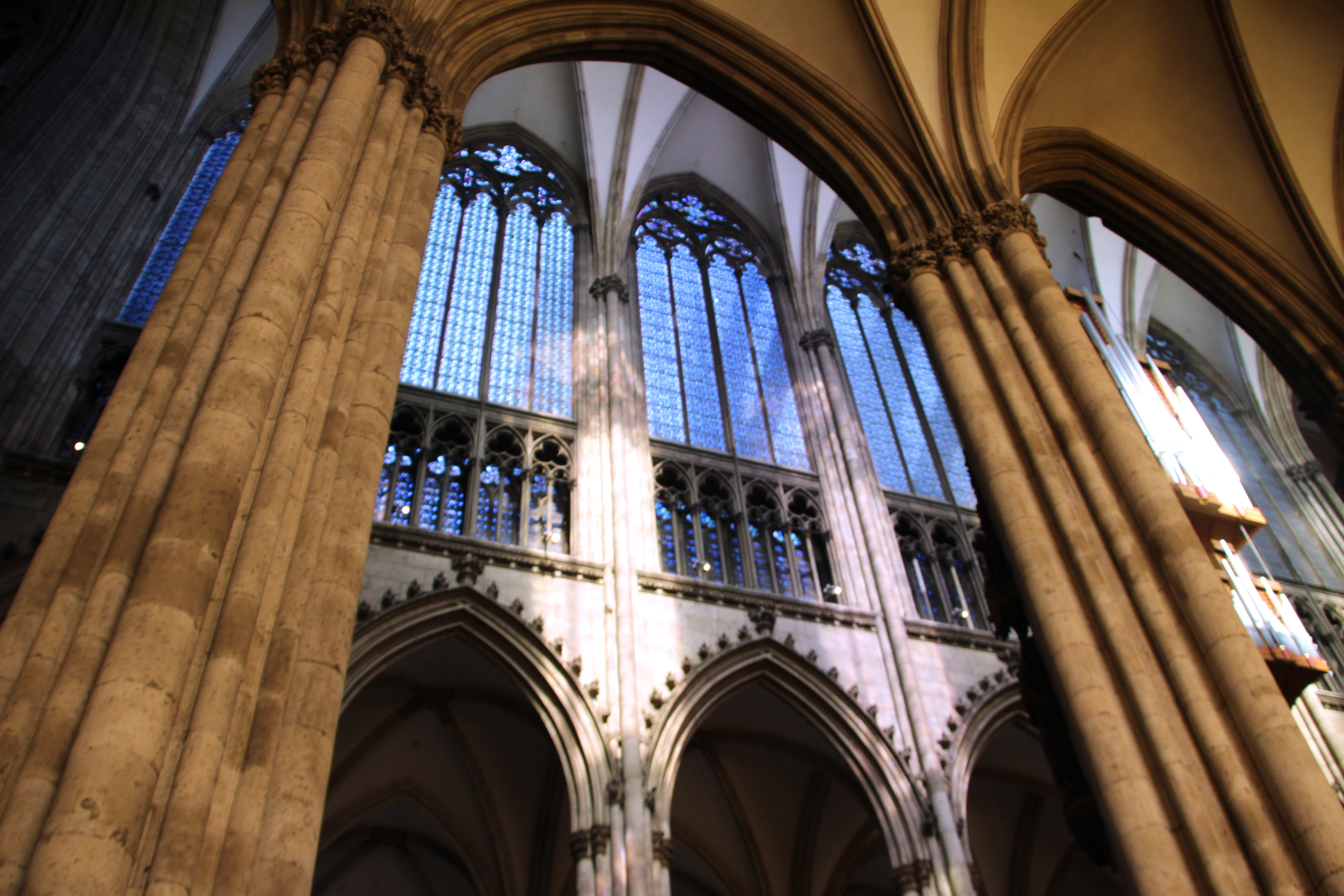
Triforium in Cologne Cathedral (Gothic Revival). The outer wall of this triforium contains large stained-glass windows.
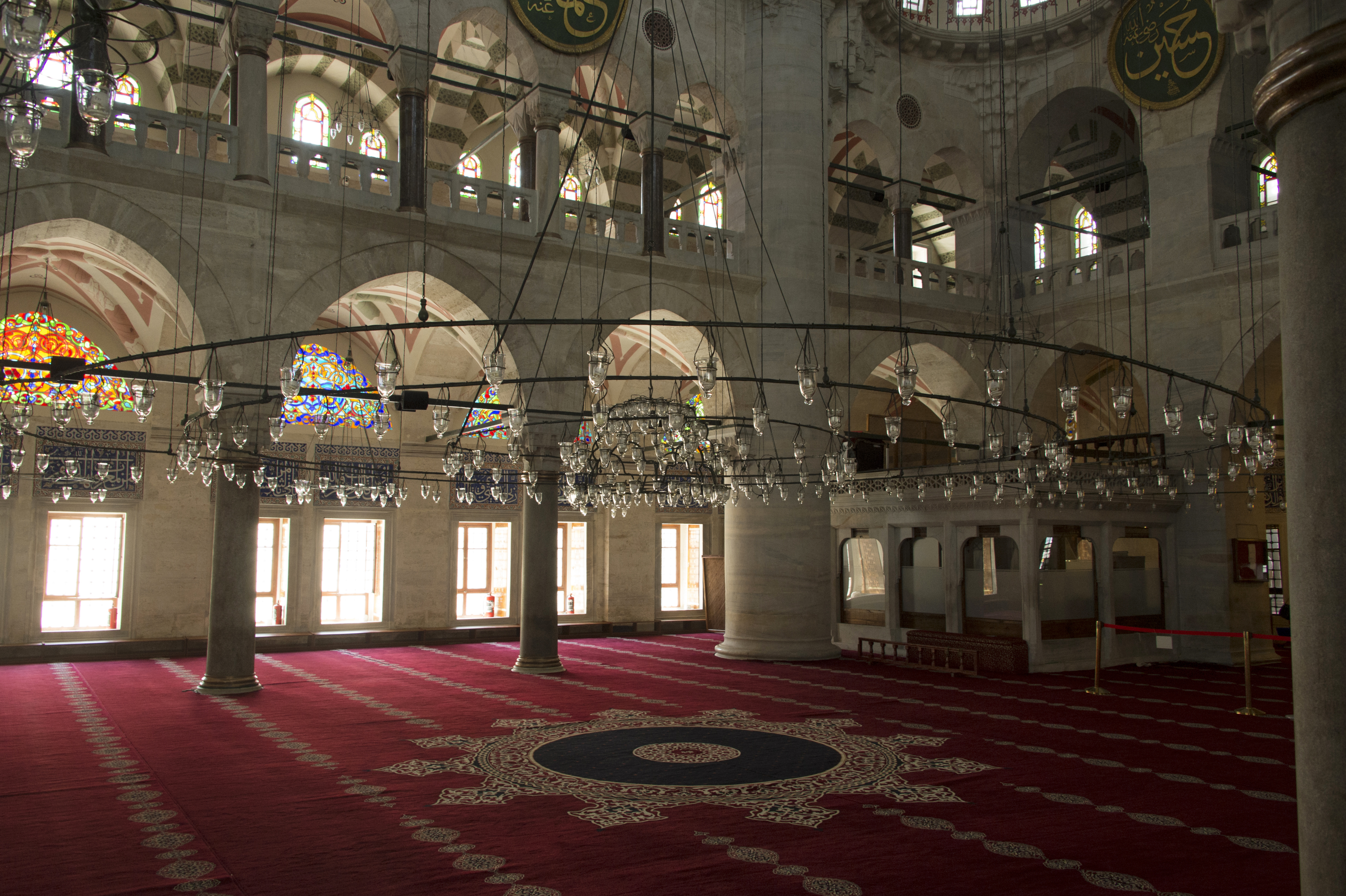
Triforium of the Kılıç Ali Pasha Complex in Istanbul

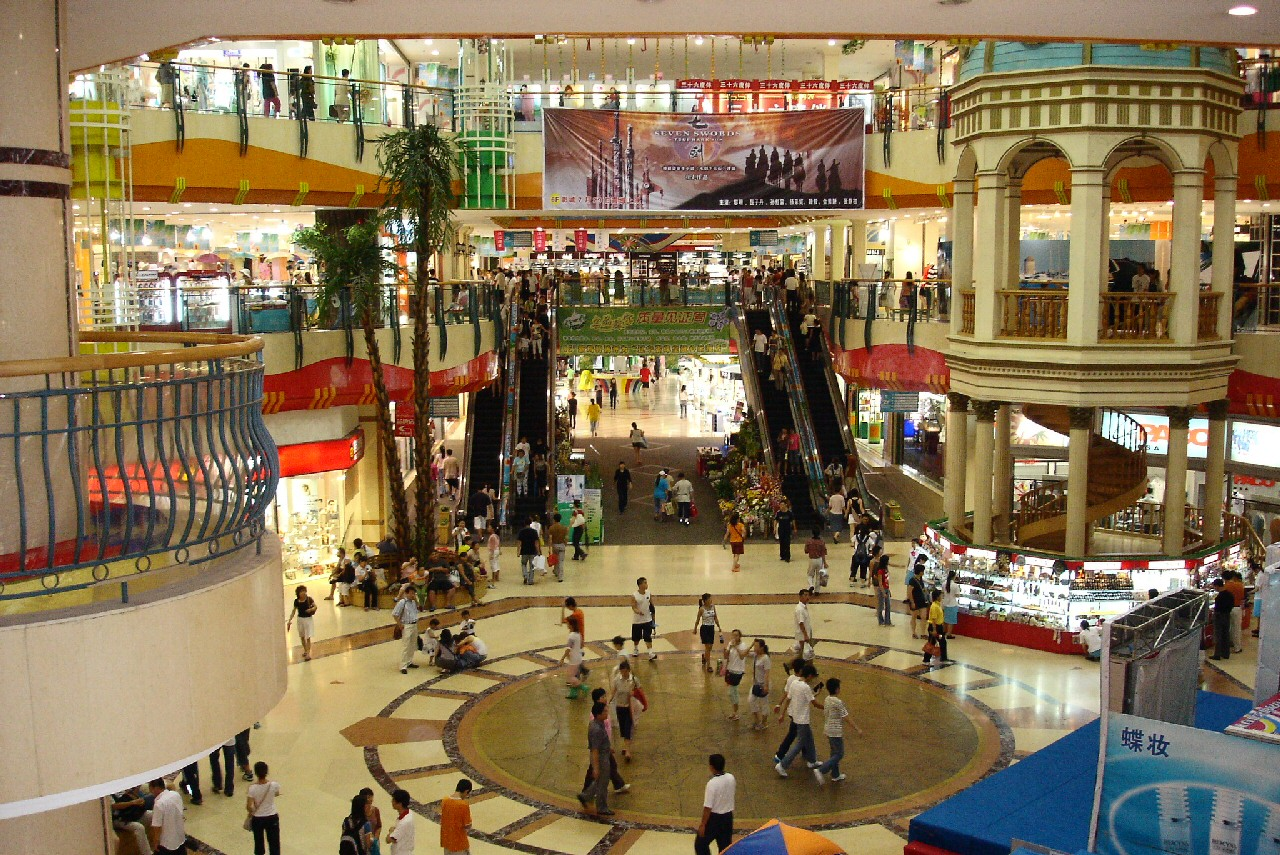
Triforium in a shopping mall in Dalian, China, a public space more similar in purpose to the Roman basilicas

== See also ==
- Cathedral architecture of the Western World
