= Basilica Opimia =

Ancient Roman civic basilica in Rome

- Shown in ancient Rome
- Click on the map for a fullscreen view
- 41°53′35″N 12°29′03″E
- Type: Basilica

The Basilica Opimia was one of four Republican-era basilicas in the Roman Forum. The other three were the Basilica Aemilia, the Basilica Porcia, and the Basilica Sempronia. Of the three, only the Basilica Aemilia partially survives.

It was built in 121 BC near the Temple of Concord and named after Lucius Opimius, who had financed its construction and that of the temple. When the Temple of Concord was enlarged under Tiberius the basilica had to be sacrificed and there is no record of its survival after that date.

== See also ==
- List of monuments of the Roman Forum

== Bibliography ==
- Filippo Coarelli, Guida archeologica di Roma, Verona, Arnoldo Mondadori Editore, 1984.
