= Basilica Sempronia =

Ancient Roman civic basilica in Rome

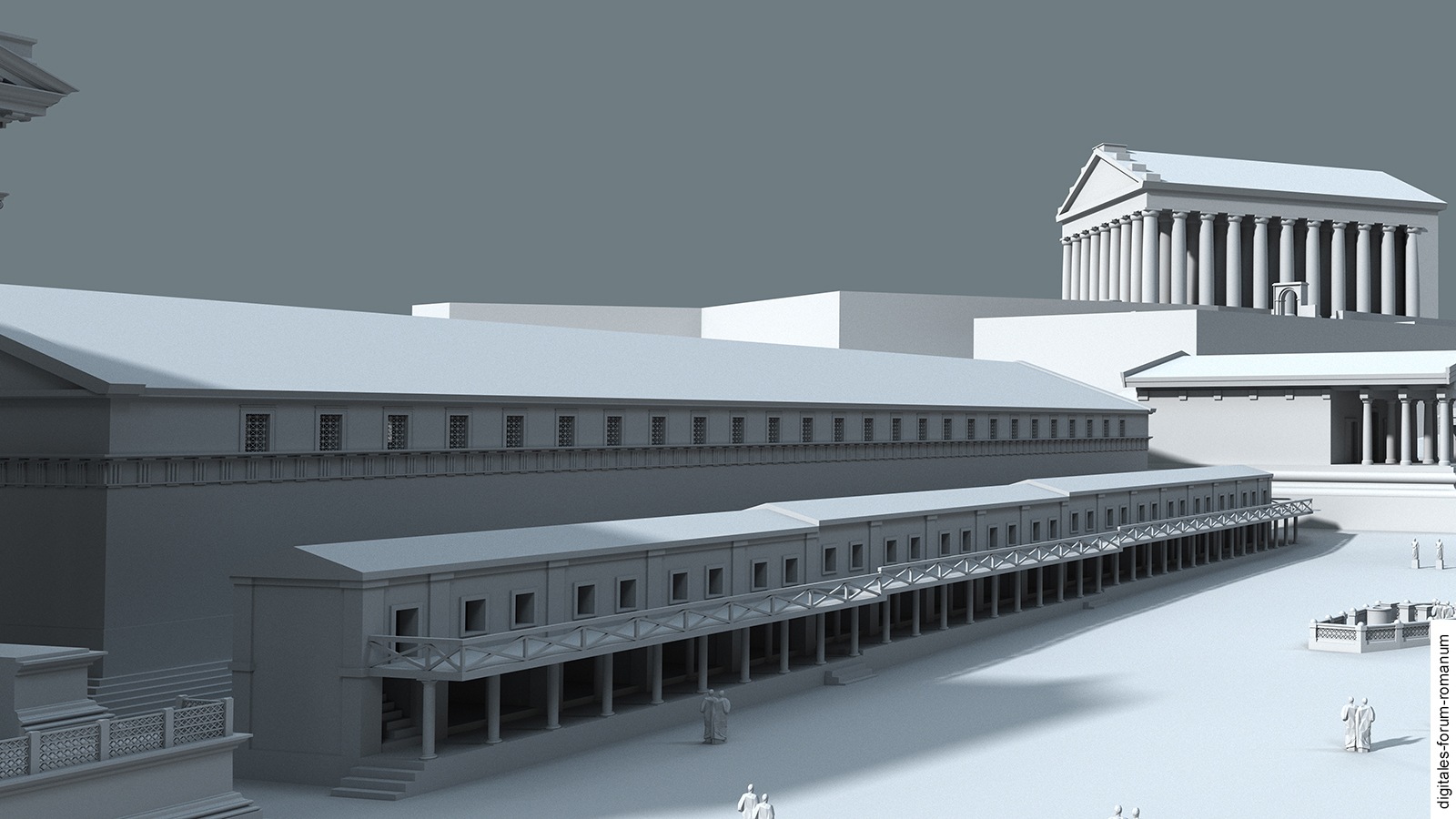
- A modern model of Basilica Sempronia

- Location within Rome
- 41.891979°N 12.484884°E
- Type: Basilica

History
- Built: 169 BC
- Built by: Tiberius Sempronius Gracchus

The Basilica Sempronia was a structure in the Roman Forum during the Republican period. It was one of four basilicas to make up the original Roman Forum alongside the Basilica Porcia, Basilica Aemilia, and Basilica Opimia, and was the third built. Although excavations have revealed remains of the basilica as well as the structures that originally stood in its place, none of them are visible from the Roman Forum.

== Construction ==
Excavation of the basilica revealed that it was most likely constructed using tufa blocks, as was common in buildings of the time. Weak areas in the building may have been reinforced with travertine blocks, and the entire facade would most likely have been covered in stucco to hide the masonry as well as decorate it. The roof would have resembled those of temples and would have been made of wooden trusses and beams. The exterior of the roof would have been covered in tiles to protect the roof from the elements, and the interior would have been coffered to lessen the weight and finished in stucco.

== History ==
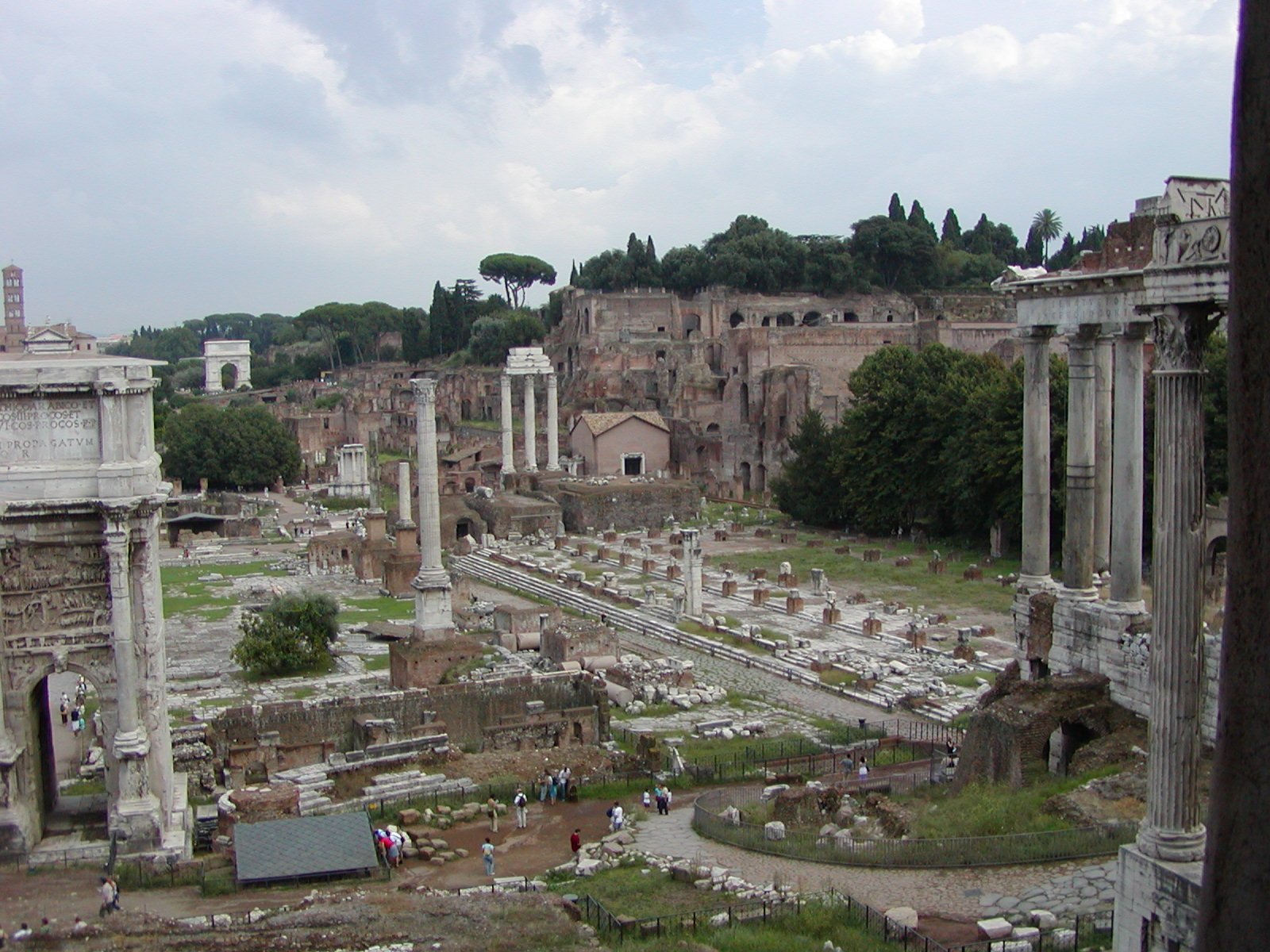
The remains of the Basilica Julia, which sit upon the site that the Basilica Sempronia was built on.

The Basilica Sempronia was built in 169 BC by Tiberius Sempronius Gracchus, a Roman political figure who was chosen censor at the time of the basilica's creation. The site was constructed on land that previously housed the residence of Scipio Africanus, along with several shops. This has led to the assumption that the property, once belonging to Scipio, was passed down to Tiberius in 184 BC following Scipio's death, given that Tiberius was married to Scipio's daughter, Cornelia Africana.

In 54 BC, the Basilica Sempronia was demolished by Julius Caesar in order to build his Basilica Julia.

== See also ==
- List of monuments of the Roman Forum
