= Basilica of Neptune =

Ancient Roman civic basilica in Rome

- Basilica Neptuni (Latin)
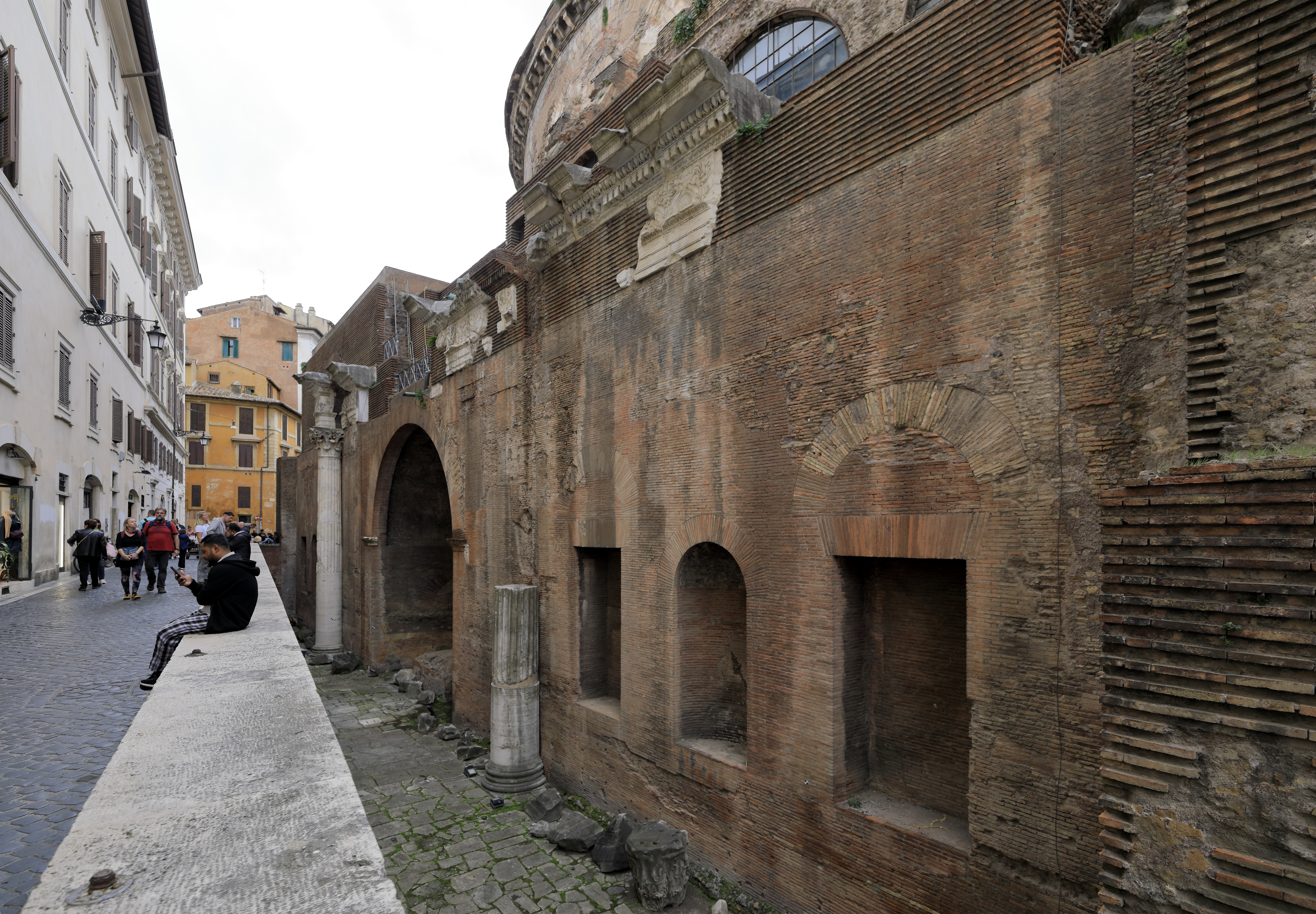
- Remains of the Basilica of Neptune visible from Via della Palombella

- Shown within Augustan Rome
- Click on the map for a fullscreen view
- 41°53′54″N 12°28′37″E
- Location: Rome, Italy
- Region: Regio IX Circus Flaminius

History
- Built: c. 25 BCE
- Built by: Marcus Vipsanius Agrippa

The Basilica of Neptune (Latin: Basilica Neptuni) was an ancient Roman basilica constructed c. 25 BCE under Marcus Vipsanius Agrippa in honour of Neptune to celebrate his naval victories at Mylae, Naulochus and Actium. Surviving fragments of the basilica remain visible on the Campus Martius in Rome.

== History ==
According to Cassius Dio, the basilica was initially constructed by Agrippa as part of a larger building program on the Campus Martius from 33 — 25 BCE. This project included the Pantheon, the Saepta Iulia and the Baths of Agrippa and was possibly financed by the proceeds from recent military victories in Illyria. The basilica was reconstructed under Hadrian (r. 117 – 138 CE) following the original basilica's destruction in a fire under Titus. This led some scholars to misidentify the Basilica of Neptune with the nearby Temple of Hadrian.

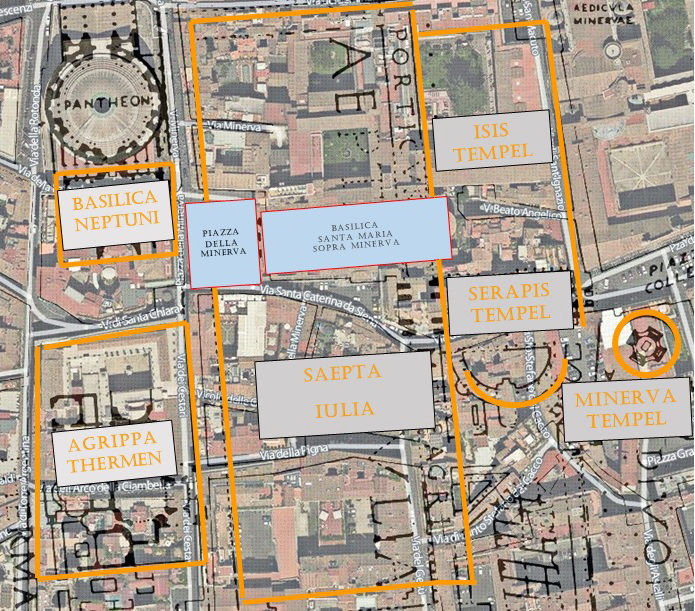
Map showing the location of the Basilica of Neptune alongside other ancient structures on the Campus Martius

== Description ==
The brick structure consisted of a large rectangular hall measuring 45 metres (148 ft) long and 19 metres (62 ft) wide, with rectangular and semicircular niches surrounding the space. It more closely resembled the imperial thermae than the classical Roman civic basilicas. The roof was cross-vaulted and was supported by Corinthian columns that upheld an entablature decorated with marine motifs. Remains of the ornamentation can be seen from Via della Palombella. Andrea Palladio drew the floorplan of the structure in the 16th century basd on the visible remains, which illustrate the architectural relationship between the Pantheon, the Baths of Agrippa, and the Baths of Neptune.

Preceded by Basilica of Maxentius	Landmarks of Rome; Basilica of Neptune	Succeeded by Basilica Ulpia
