= Basilica Argentaria =

Ancient Roman civic basilica in Rome

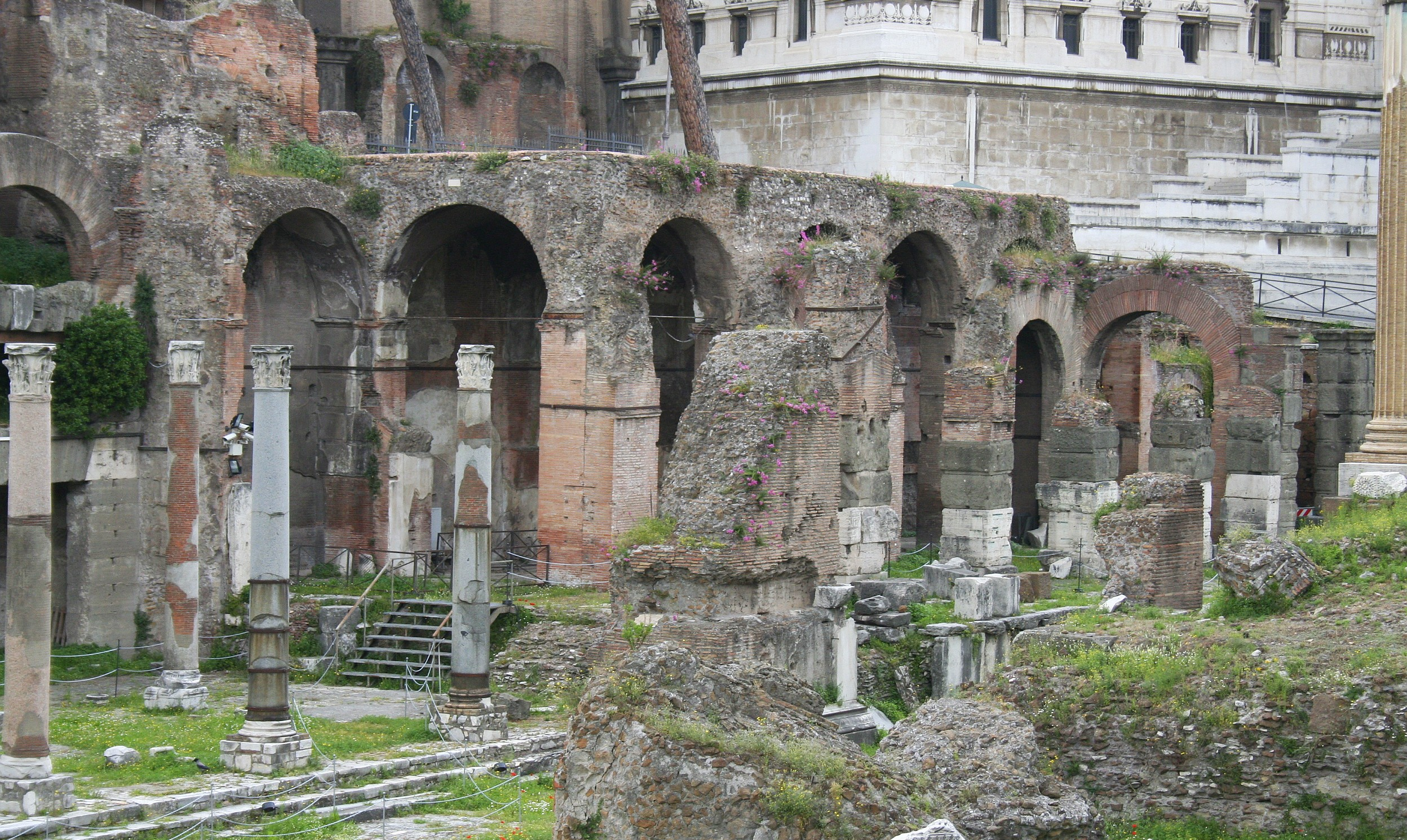
- Basilica Argentaria today

- Shown within Augustan Rome
- Click on the map for a fullscreen view
- 41°53′39″N 12°29′04″E
- Type: Basilica
- Location: Regio VIII Forum Romanum

History
- Built by: Trajan

The Basilica Argentaria is a portico with pillars lining the Temple of Venus Genetrix in the Forum of Caesar in Rome (Italy). The name only appears in late sources of the age of Constantine.

== History ==
The building was erected under Trajan, to adapt the slopes of the Capitoline Hill after the removal of the gap between it and the Quirinal Hill.

== Design ==
It was higher than the level of the square, and access was through two staircases located at the south-west end of the portico. The portico had two rows of pillars made of tuff stones, and its naves were covered with barrel vaults, partially preserved. As the basilica rose in an obligated space, it has an irregular drawing, turning round the temple and probably continuing out of the present archaeological area, close to the south-west exedra of the Trajan's Forum.

== Remains ==
The plaster covering the back wall of the building, still preserved, displays several graffiti, some of which quote lines of the Aeneid. This detail makes it possible that the basilica housed a school, mentioned by late sources about the Trajan's Forum and the Forum of Augustus.

Preceded by Forum Holitorium	Landmarks of Rome; Basilica Argentaria	Succeeded by Basilica Julia
