= Centumviral court =

Court of ancient Rome

The centumviral court (centumviri) was a court of ancient Rome dealing with private law (also known as civil law).

== Evolution ==
The term centumviri means "100 men"; this was the original number of members from which pool the court was selected. The number of men of which the court consisted is not known. In the Republic, the number increased to 105 and later still, during the Empire, to 180.

The antiquity of the court is attested by the symbol and formula used in its procedure, the lance (Latin: hasta) as the sign of true ownership, the oath or wager (Latin: sacramentum), the ancient formula for recovery of property or assertion of liberty.

During the Empire, four courts were usually chosen from the pool, although the entire membership might sit in unusual cases. The Decemviri (ten men) presided over the court from the Augustan period. Membership of this council was considered to be a standard position for those embarking on the cursus honorum.

A number of notable orators appeared in this court, including Cicero, Tacitus and Pliny the Younger.

== Jurisdiction ==
The jurisdiction of the court is unclear, although cases involving wills and inheritance were certainly part of the court's remit. The querela inofficiosi testamenti ("complaint about an undutiful will") was established by this court. However, it is uncertain whether this court was simply an alternative to the iudex or part of a more complex judicial system. It has been suggested that cases before the centumviral court had a specific minimum value.

== Location ==
In the second half of the 1st century the court met in the Basilica Julia in the Forum. It is likely that, like many such Roman institutions, the physical location of the court was apt to change.

== Cicero's account ==
The centumviri were mainly concerned with the property of which account was taken at the census. It was therefore in their power to make or unmake a citizen. They also decided questions concerning debt. Hence the plebs had an interest in securing their decisions against undue influence. They were never regarded as magistrates, but merely as judices, and as such would be appointed for a fixed term of service by the magistrate, probably by the praetor urbanus. But in Cicero's time they were elected by the Comitia Tributa. They then numbered 105. Their original number is uncertain, although the centum (Latin for the number 100) portion of centumviri may provide a clue. It was probably increased by Augustus and in Pliny's time had reached 180. The office was probably open in quite early times to both patricians and plebeians. The term is also applied in the inscriptions of Veii to the municipal senates and Cures, which numbered 100 members.
