= Basilica Porcia =

Ancient Roman civic basilica in Rome

Coordinates: 41.8933°N 12.4848°E

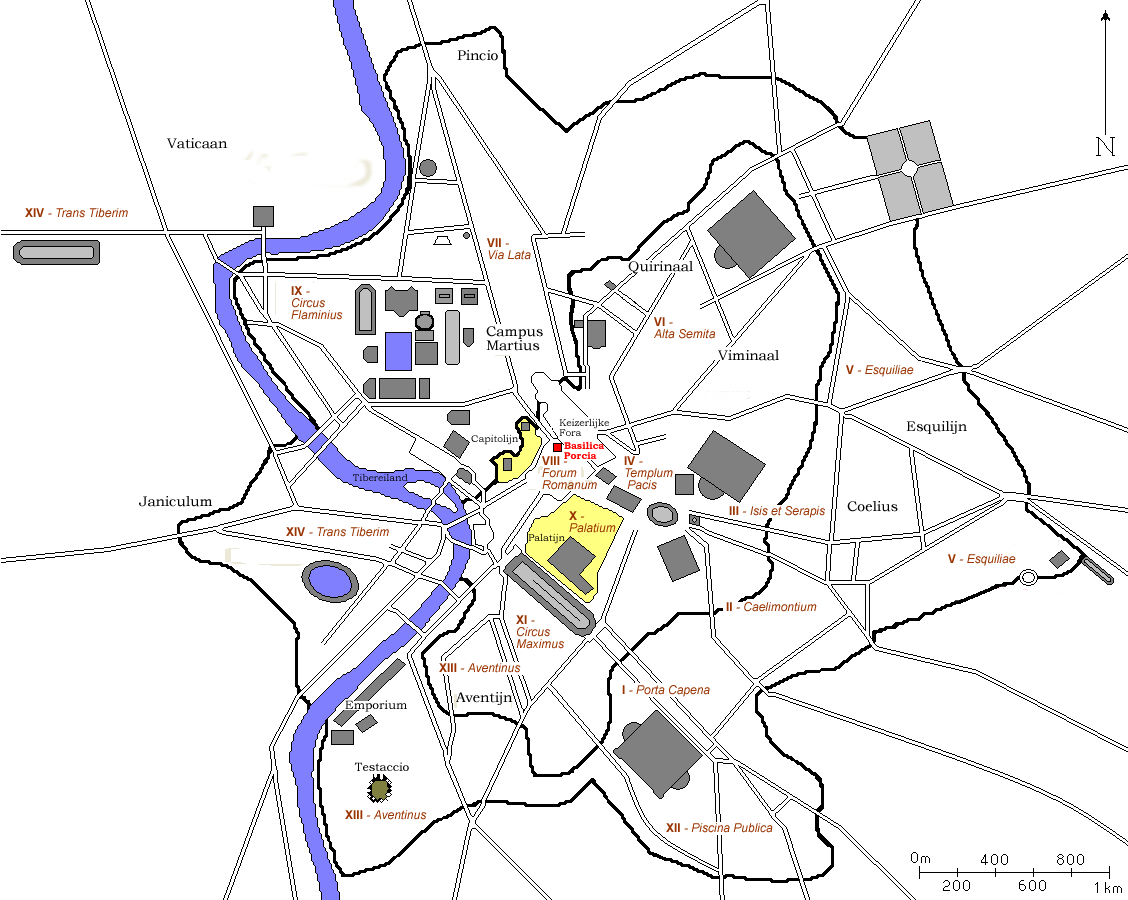
Location of the Basilica Porcia on a map of ancient Rome

The Basilica Porcia was the first civil basilica built in ancient Rome. It was built by order of Marcus Porcius Cato in 184 BC as censor and is named after him. He built it as a space for administering laws and for merchants to meet, against some opposition. It stood to the west of the Curia, on land bought by Cato and previously occupied by shops and private houses. Many trials were held inside the basilica.

It was destroyed by fire after the body of Publius Clodius Pulcher was alit on a pyre in the adjoining senate house in 52 BC. The ruins were probably flattened later that year for a new building on the site.

== Bibliography ==
- Filippo Coarelli, Guida archeologica di Roma, Verona, Arnoldo Mondadori Editore, 1984.
