= Roman sculpture =

Sculpture of ancient Rome

Sculpture of ancient Rome

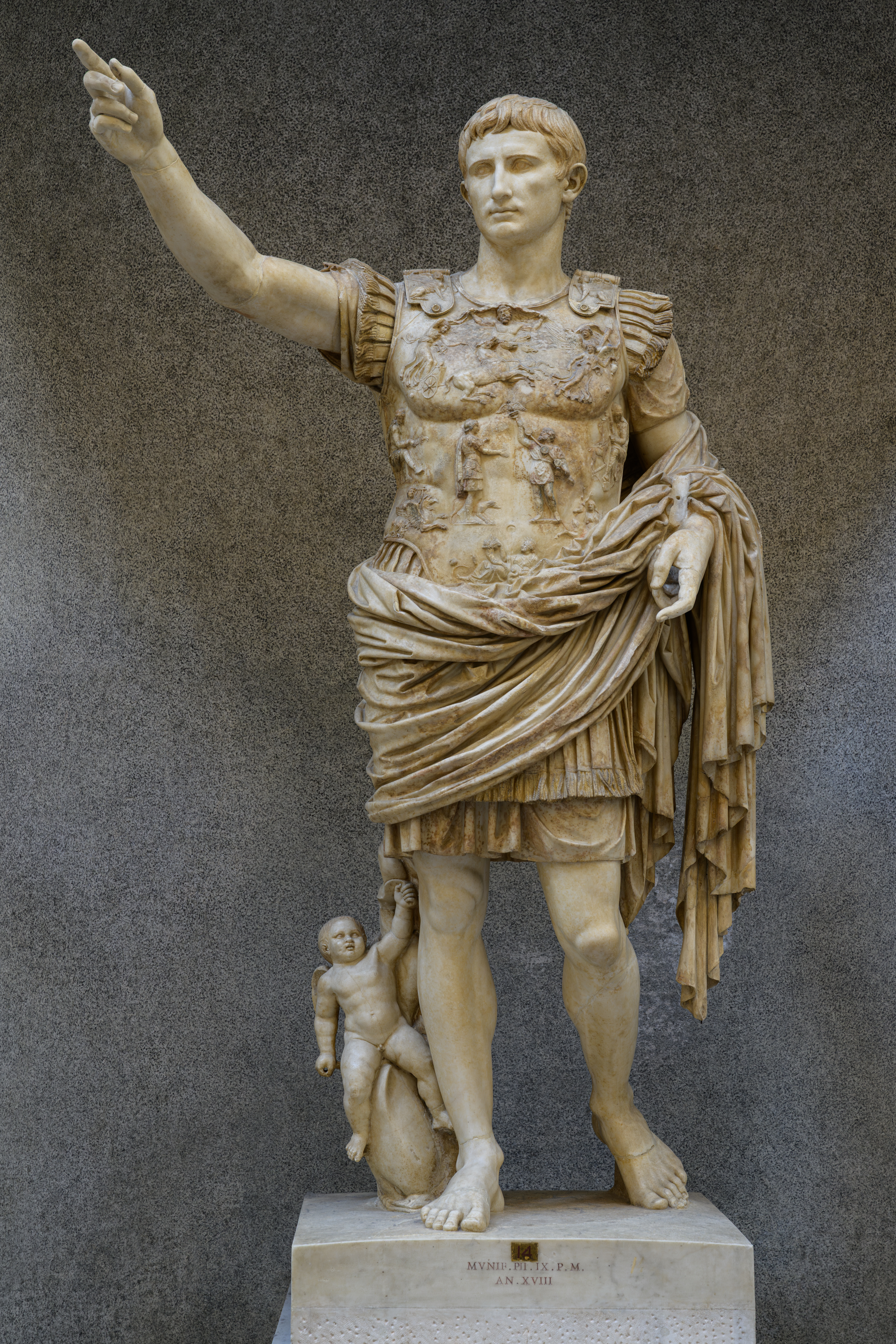
Augustus of Prima Porta

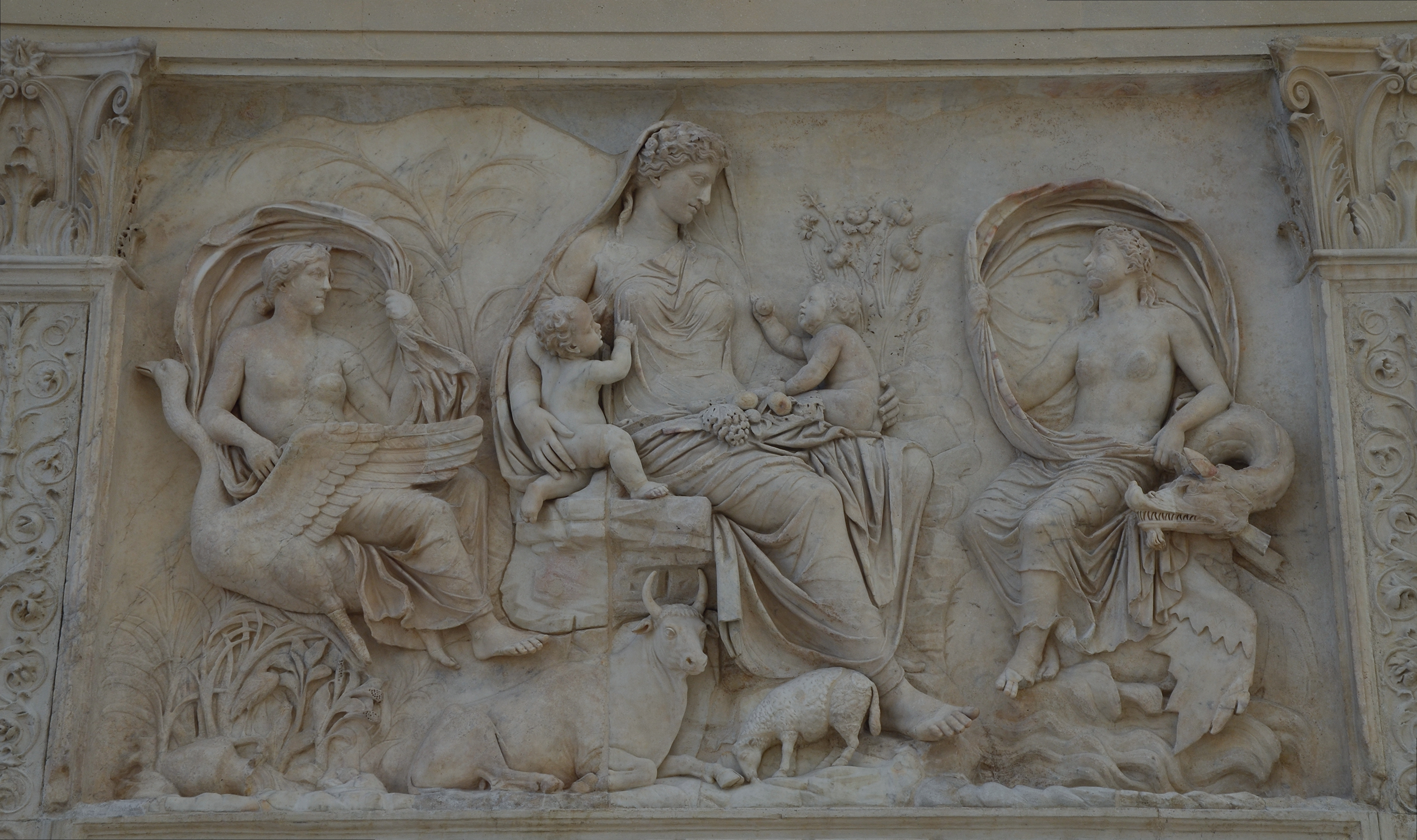
Tellus relief, Ara Pacis

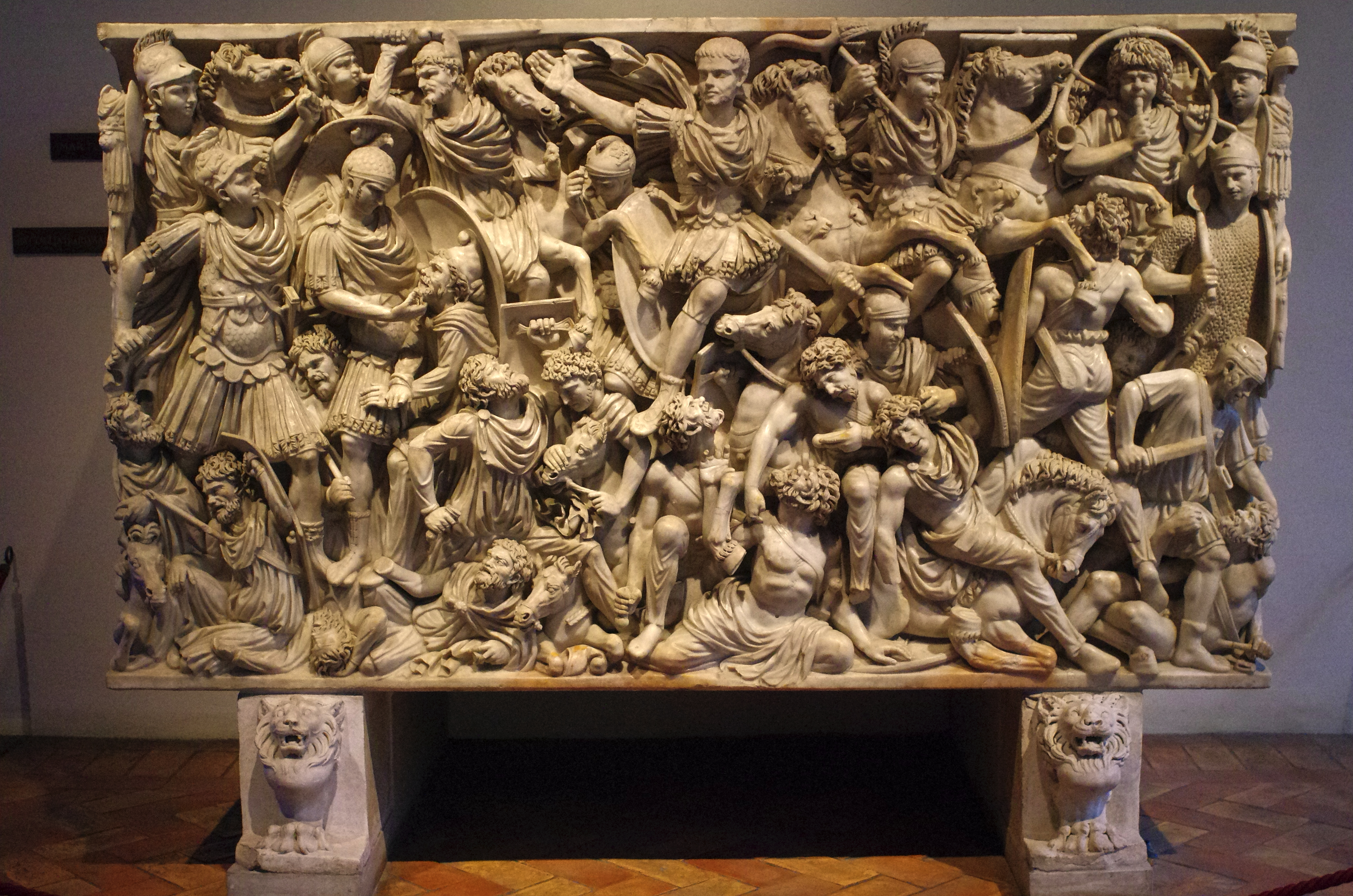
Ludovisi Battle sarcophagus

The sculpture of ancient Rome refers to the three-dimensional works of art produced under Roman rule from the foundation of the city in the eighth century BCE to the fall of the Western Roman Empire in 476 CE. Sculpture played a central role in Roman public life; it depicted deities for worship, commemorated the political elite, celebrated historical events, and honored the dead. In private contexts, household representations of gods ancestors enabled ancient Romans to practice domestic devotion and ancestral remembrance. In both public and private spheres, systems of patronage were fundamental to the development of Roman sculpture. One of the most distinctive features of Roman sculpture is its emphasis on portraiture. In free-standing statues, busts, reliefs, and gem cameos, individuals were represented in both idealized and highly realistic modes. Roman sculptors worked primarily in marble sourced from across the Mediterranean, but they also employed materials such as bronze, travertine, tufa, basalt, granite, and porphyry. Although most Roman sculptures appear unpainted today, surviving traces indicate that polychromy was widespread in antiquity.

After the fall of the Roman Empire, many sculptures were lost, destroyed, or reused as spolia throughout the Middle Ages. The Renaissance renewed interest in Roman antiquity, and ancient sculpture played a formative role in the development of Western art in the fifteenth and sixteenth centuries. Modern scholarship has reassessed Roman sculpture in light of its close relationship to Greek precedents. While earlier art historians often viewed Roman works as derivative of Greek models, contemporary approaches emphasize Roman sculpture as a tradition shaped by local contexts and by participation in a broader Mediterranean visual culture.

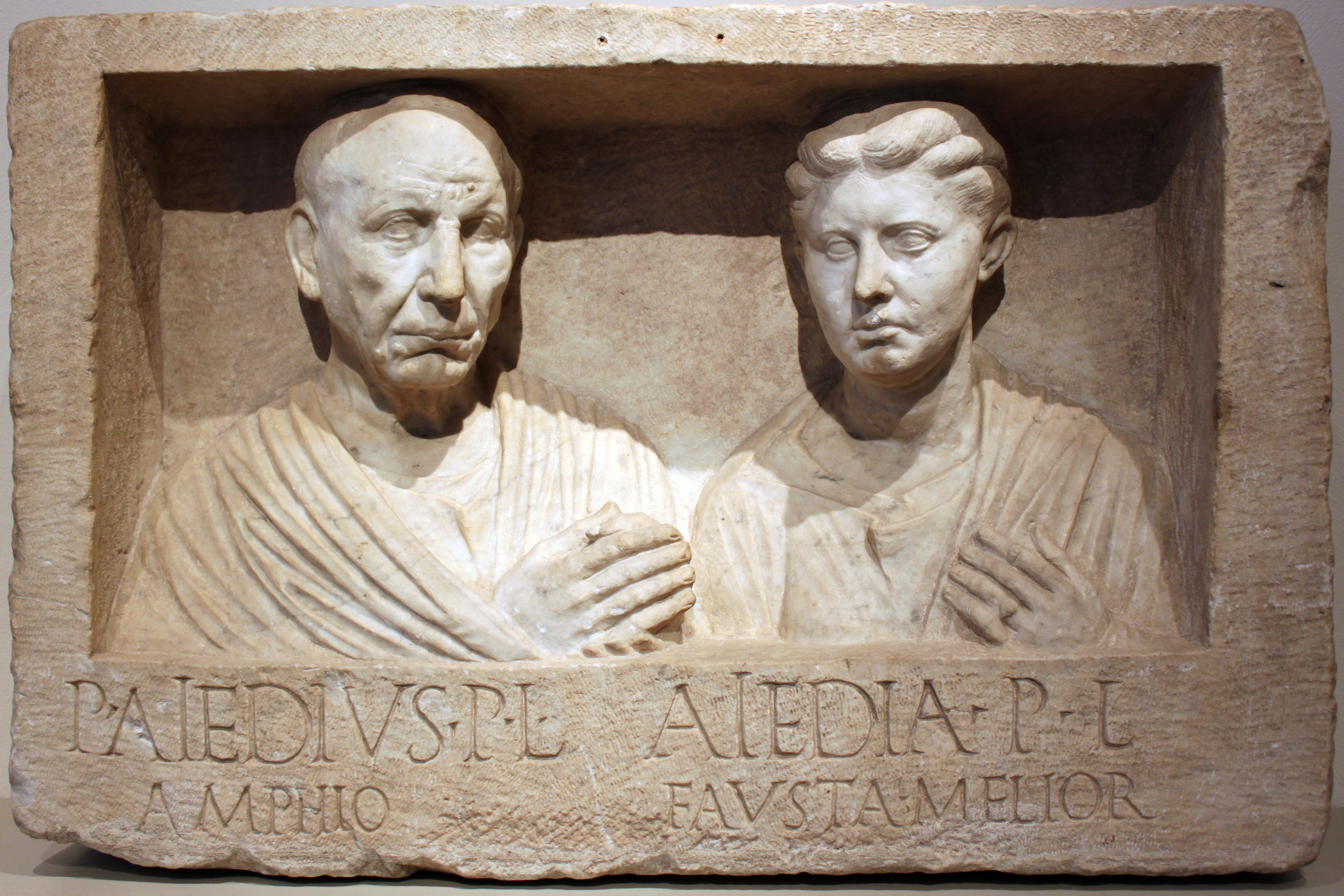
The Grave relief of Publius Aiedius and Aiedia, 30 BCE, Pergamon Museum (Berlin), with a more realist "Italian" style

== Development ==
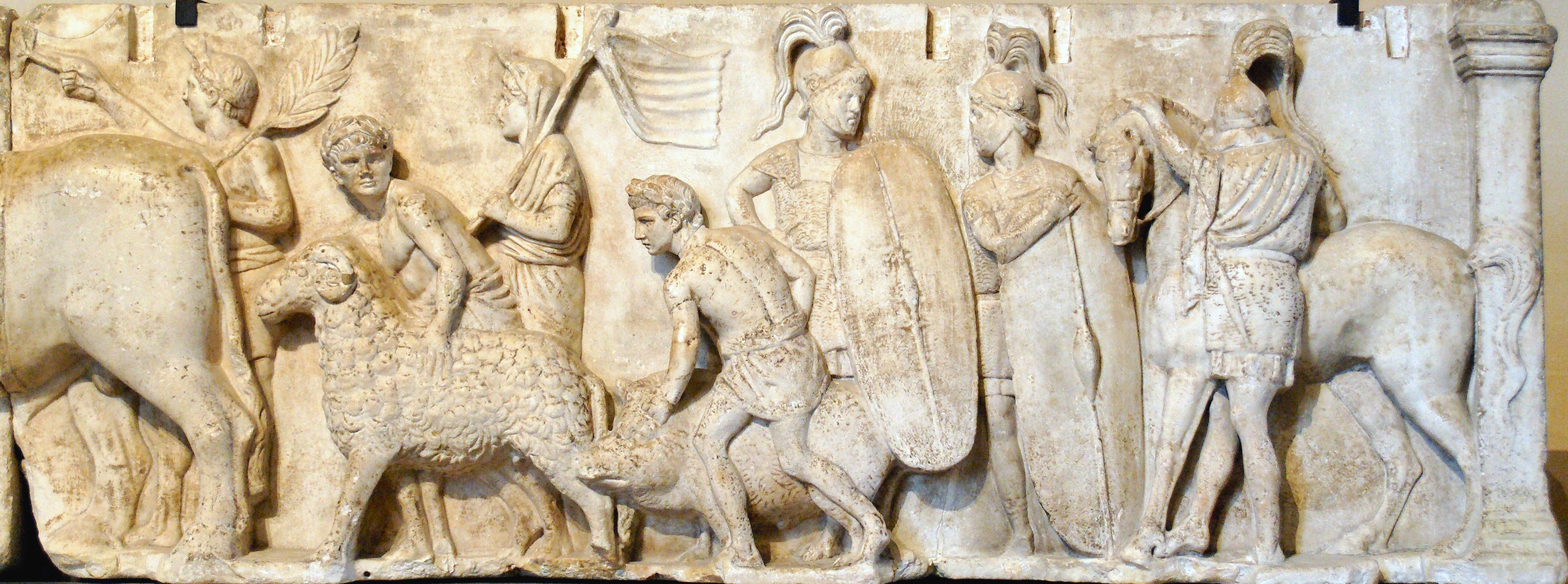
Detail from the Ahenobarbus relief showing (centre-right) two Roman foot-soldiers c. 122 BCE. Two of the men are wearing Montefortino-style helmets with horsehair plume, chain mail cuirasses with shoulder reinforcement, oval shields with calfskin covers, gladius and pilum

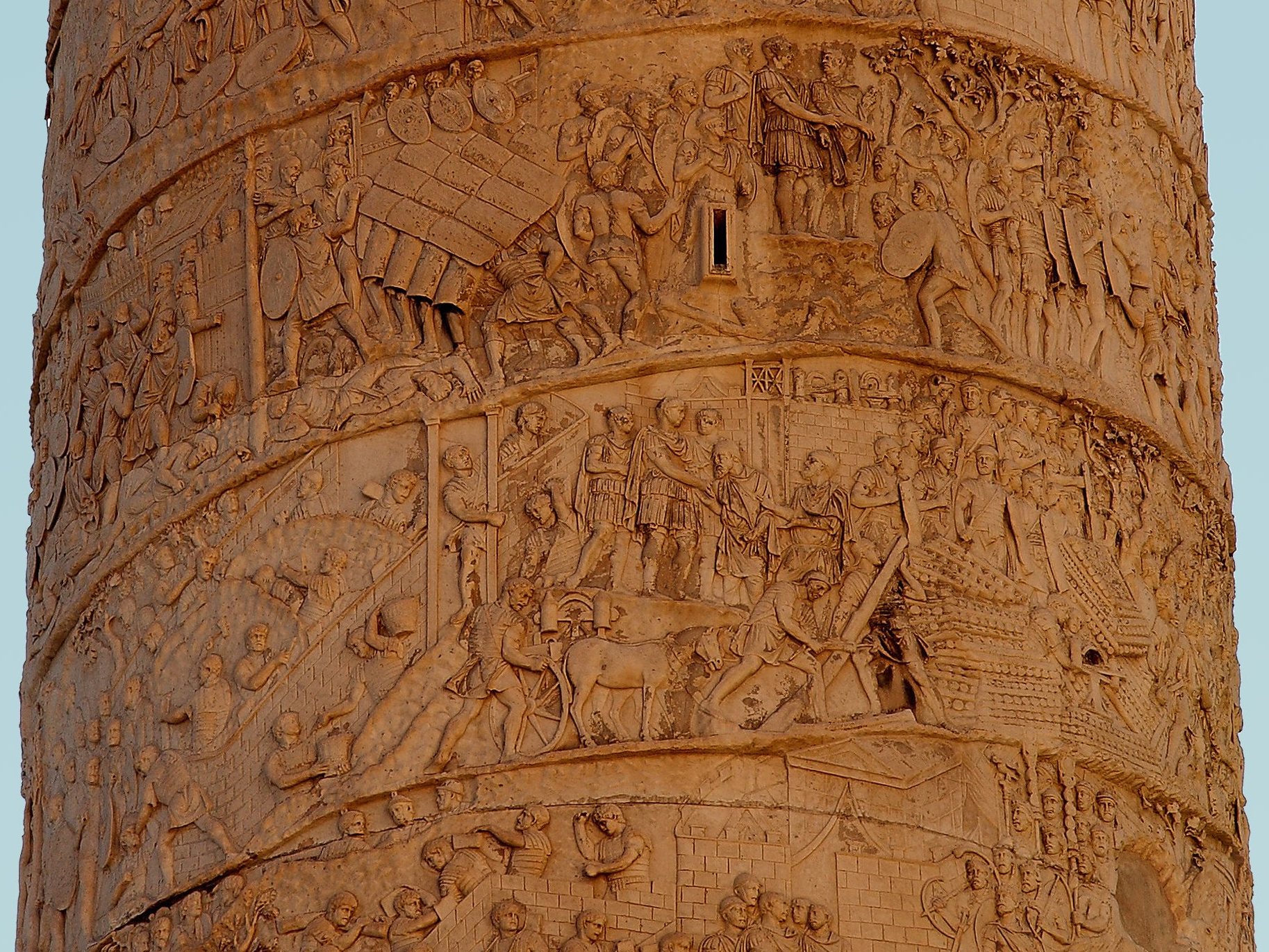
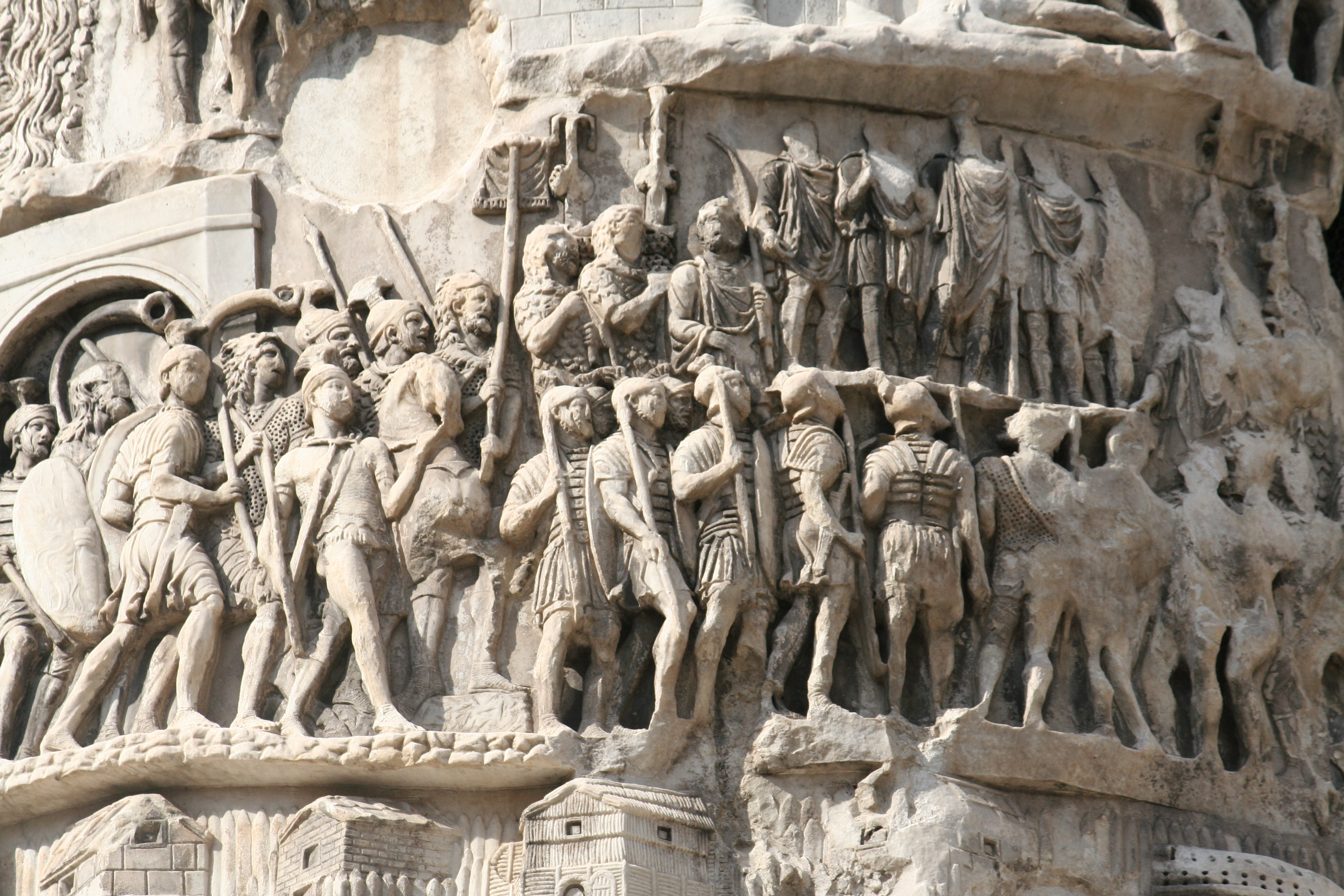
Left image: Section of Trajan's Column, Rome, 113 AD, with scenes from the Trajan's Dacian Wars
Right image: Section and detail of the Column of Marcus Aurelius, Rome, 177–180 AD, with scenes from the Marcomannic Wars

Early Roman art was influenced by the art of Greece and that of the neighboring Etruscans, themselves greatly influenced by their Greek trading partners. An Etruscan speciality was near life size tomb effigies in terracotta, usually lying on top of a sarcophagus lid propped up on one elbow in the pose of a diner in that period. As the expanding Roman Republic began to conquer Greek territory, at first in Southern Italy and then the entire Hellenistic world except for the Parthian far east, official and patrician sculpture became largely an extension of the Hellenistic style, from which specifically Roman elements are hard to disentangle, especially as so much Greek sculpture survives only in copies of the Roman period. By the 2nd century BCE, "most of the sculptors working at Rome" were Greek, often enslaved in conquests such as that of Corinth (146 BCE), and sculptors continued to be mostly Greeks, often slaves, whose names are very rarely recorded. Sculpting was not considered a profession by Romans — at most, it was accepted as a hobby. Vast numbers of Greek statues were imported to Rome, whether as booty or the result of extortion or commerce, and temples were often decorated with re-used Greek works.

A native Italian style can be seen in the tomb monuments of prosperous middle-class Romans, which very often featured portrait busts, and portraiture is arguably the main strength of Roman sculpture. There are no survivals from the tradition of masks of ancestors that were worn in processions at the funerals of the great families and otherwise displayed in the home, but many of the busts that survive must represent ancestral figures, perhaps from the large family tombs like the Tomb of the Scipios or the later mausolea outside the city. The famous "Capitoline Brutus", a bronze head supposedly of Lucius Junius Brutus is very variously dated, but taken as a very rare survival of Italic style under the Republic, in the preferred medium of bronze. Similarly stern and forceful heads are seen in the coins of the consuls, and in the Imperial period coins as well as busts sent around the Empire to be placed in the basilicas of provincial cities were the main visual form of imperial propaganda; even Londinium had a near-colossal statue of Nero, though far smaller than the 30-metre-high Colossus of Nero in Rome, now lost. The Tomb of Eurysaces the Baker, a successful freedman (c. 50–20 BC) has a frieze that is an unusually large example of the "plebeian" style.

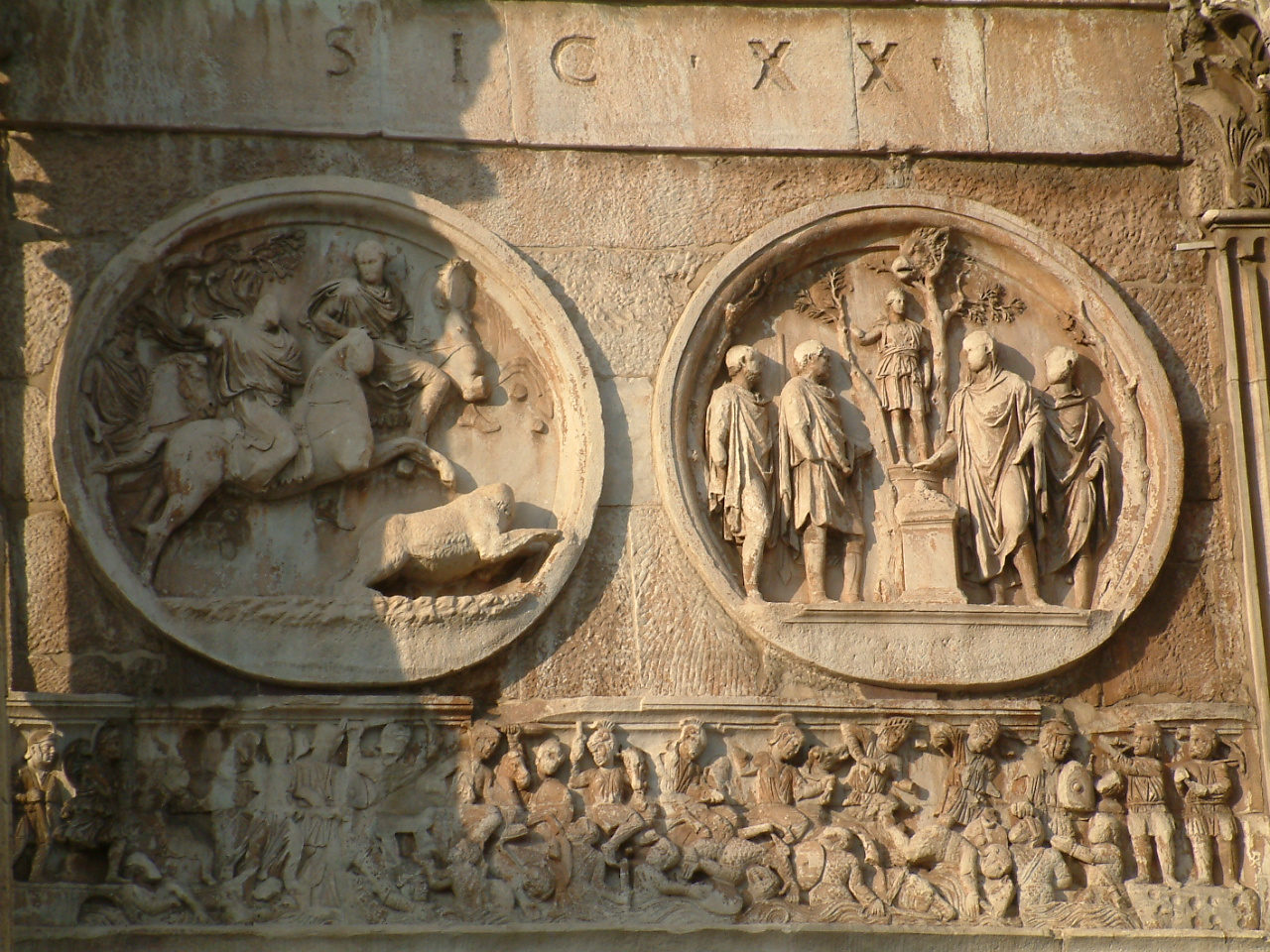
Arch of Constantine, 315: Hadrian lion-hunting (left) and sacrificing (right), above a section of the Constantinian frieze, showing the contrast of styles.

The Romans did not generally attempt to compete with free-standing Greek works of heroic exploits from history or mythology, but from early on produced historical works in relief, culminating in the great Roman triumphal columns with continuous narrative reliefs winding around them, of which those commemorating Trajan (CE 113) and Marcus Aurelius (by 193) survive in Rome, where the Ara Pacis ("Altar of Peace", 13 BCE) represents the official Greco-Roman style at its most classical and refined. Among other major examples are the earlier re-used reliefs on the Arch of Constantine and the base of the Column of Antoninus Pius (161), Campana reliefs were cheaper pottery versions of marble reliefs and the taste for relief was from the imperial period expanded to the sarcophagus.

All forms of luxury small sculpture continued to be patronized, and quality could be extremely high, as in the silver Warren Cup, glass Lycurgus Cup, and large cameos like the Gemma Augustea, Gonzaga Cameo and the "Great Cameo of France". For a much wider section of the population, moulded relief decoration of pottery vessels and small figurines were produced in great quantity and often considerable quality.

After moving through a late 2nd century "baroque" phase, in the 3rd century, Roman art largely abandoned, or simply became unable to produce, sculpture in the classical tradition, a change whose causes remain much discussed. Even the most important imperial monuments now showed stumpy, large-eyed figures in a harsh frontal style, in simple compositions emphasizing power at the expense of grace. The contrast is famously illustrated in the Arch of Constantine of 315 in Rome, which combines sections in the new style with roundels in the earlier full Greco-Roman style taken from elsewhere, and the Four Tetrarchs (c. 305) from the new capital of Constantinople, now in Venice. Ernst Kitzinger found in both monuments the same "stubby proportions, angular movements, an ordering of parts through symmetry and repetition and a rendering of features and drapery folds through incisions rather than modelling... The hallmark of the style wherever it appears consists of an emphatic hardness, heaviness and angularity — in short, an almost complete rejection of the classical tradition".

This revolution in style shortly preceded the period in which Christianity was adopted by the Roman state and the great majority of the people, leading to the end of large religious sculpture, with large statues now only used for emperors, as in the famous fragments of a colossal acrolithic statue of Constantine, and the 4th or 5th century Colossus of Barletta. However rich Christians continued to commission reliefs for sarcophagi, as in the Sarcophagus of Junius Bassus, and very small sculpture, especially in ivory, was continued by Christians, building on the style of the consular diptych.

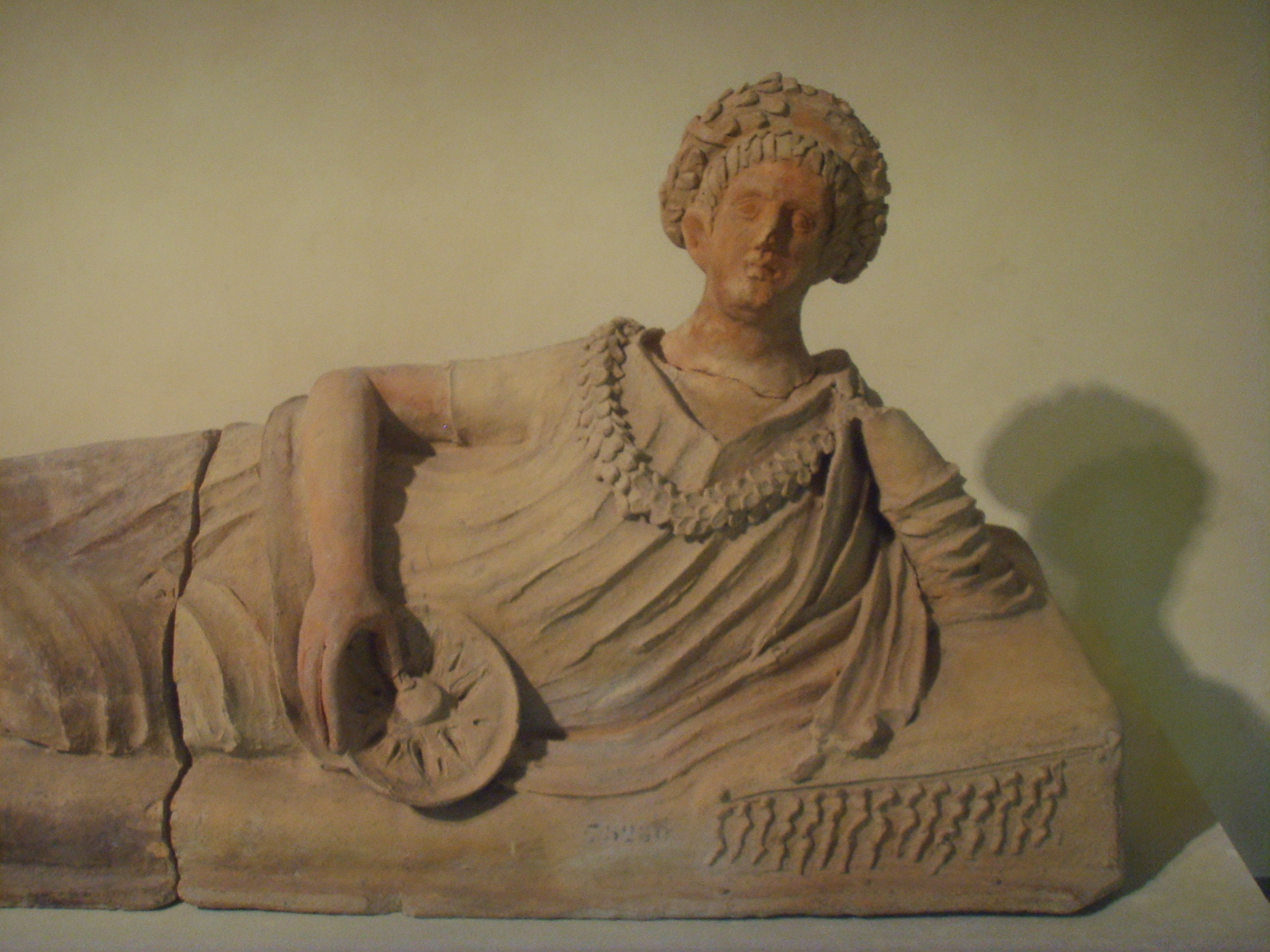
Etruscan sarcophagus, 3rd century BCE

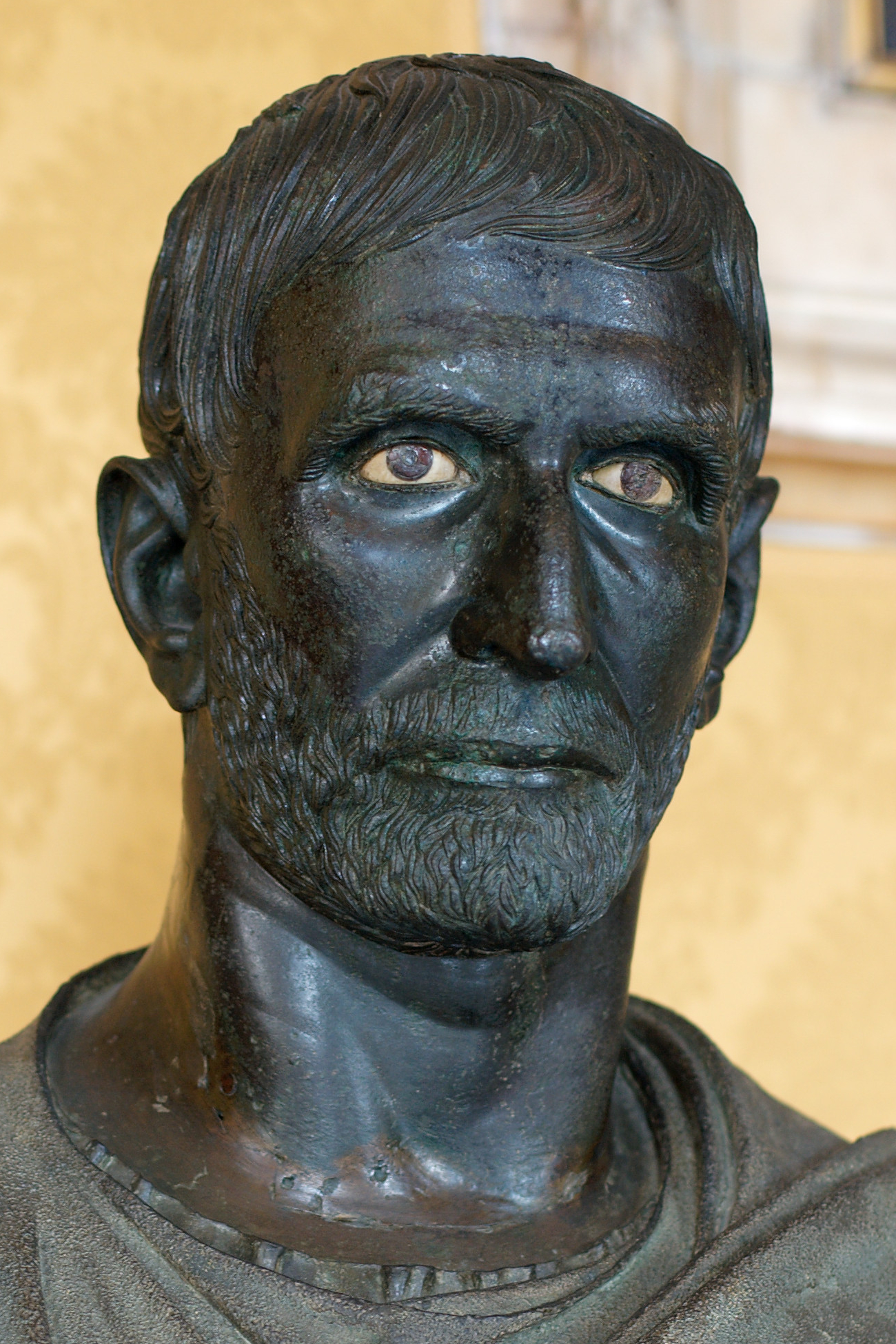
The "Capitoline Brutus", probably late 4th to early 3rd century BCE, possibly 1st century BC.

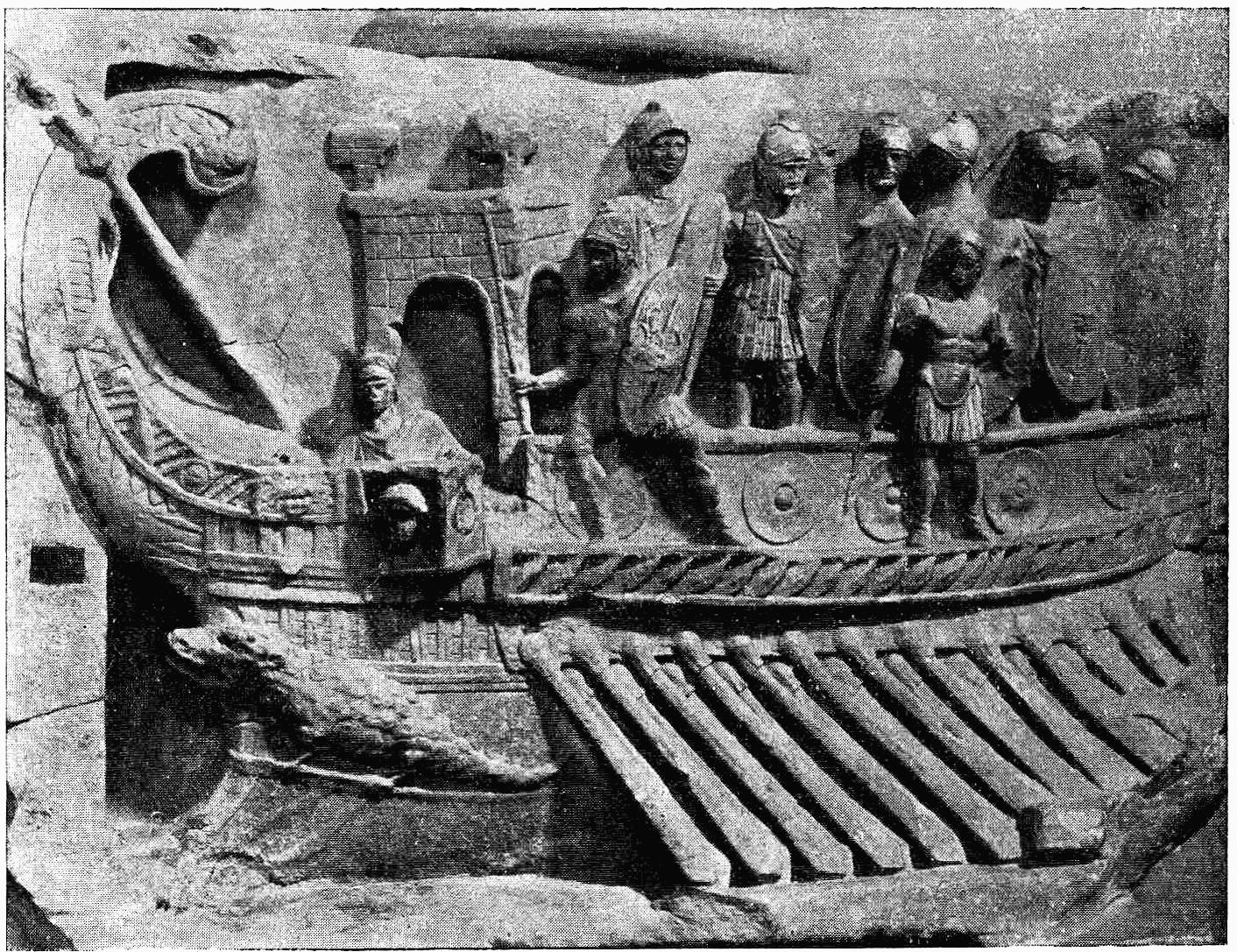
A Roman naval bireme depicted in a relief from the Temple of Fortuna Primigenia in Praeneste (Palestrina), which was built c. 120 BCE; exhibited in the Pius-Clementine Museum (Museo Pio-Clementino) in the Vatican Museums.

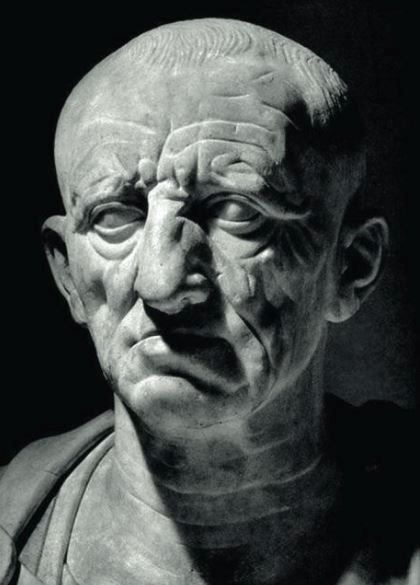
The Patrician Torlonia bust, believed to be of Cato the Elder. 1st century BCE

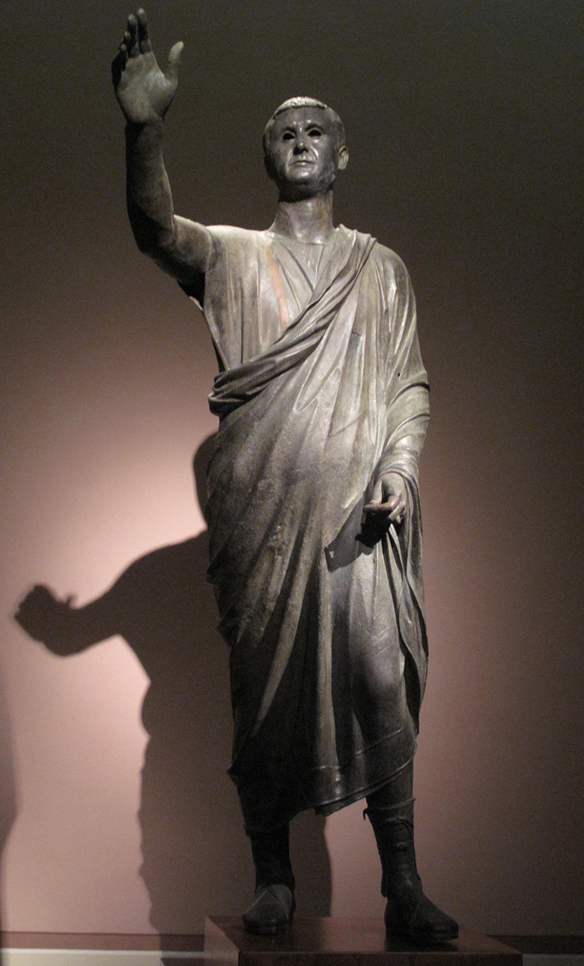
The Orator, c. 100 BCE, an Etrusco-Roman bronze statue depicting Aule Metele (Latin: Aulus Metellus), an Etruscan man wearing a Roman toga while engaged in rhetoric; the statue features an inscription in the Etruscan alphabet

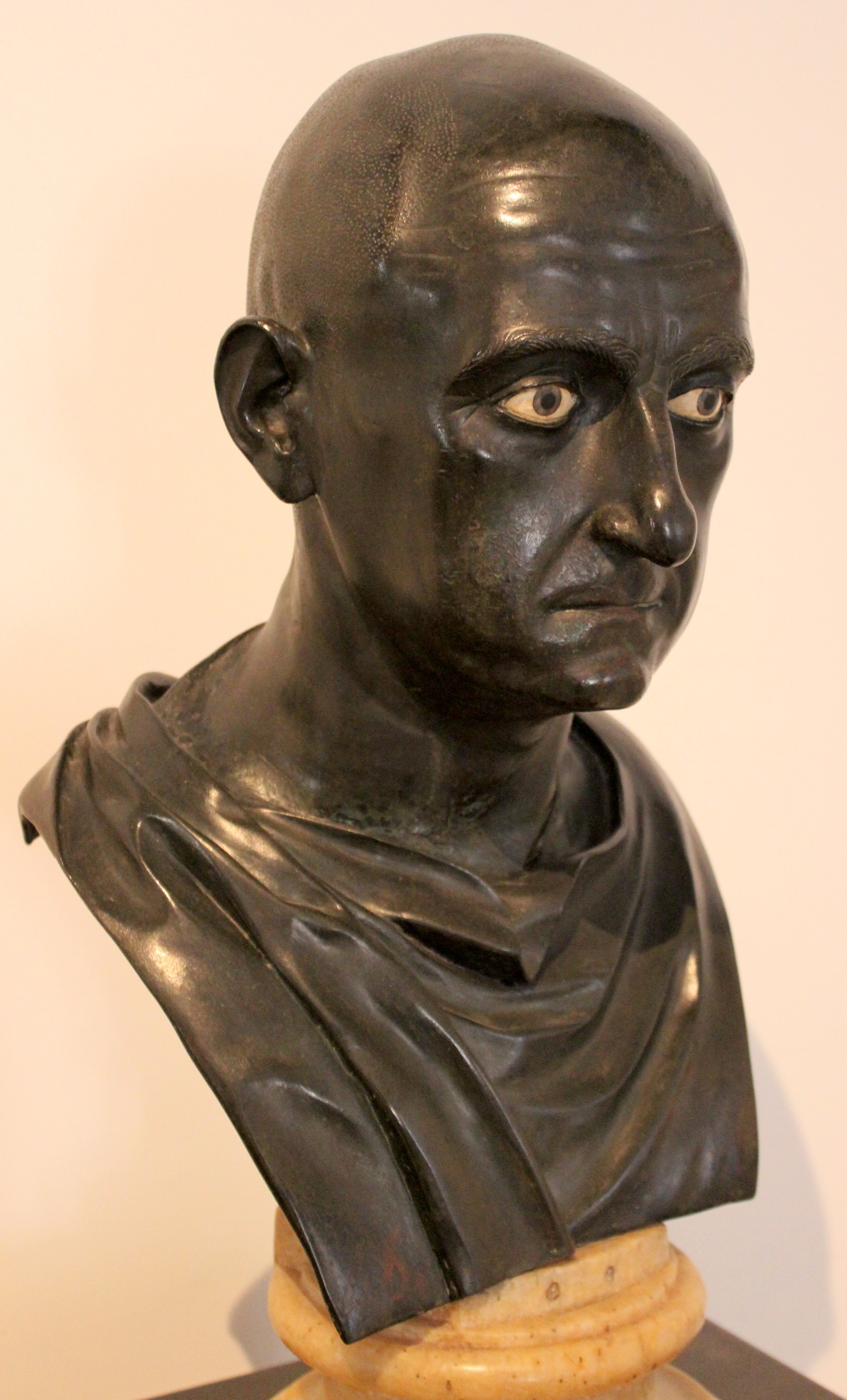
Bronze bust of Roman Isis priest, formerly identified as Scipio Africanus, mid 1st century BCE

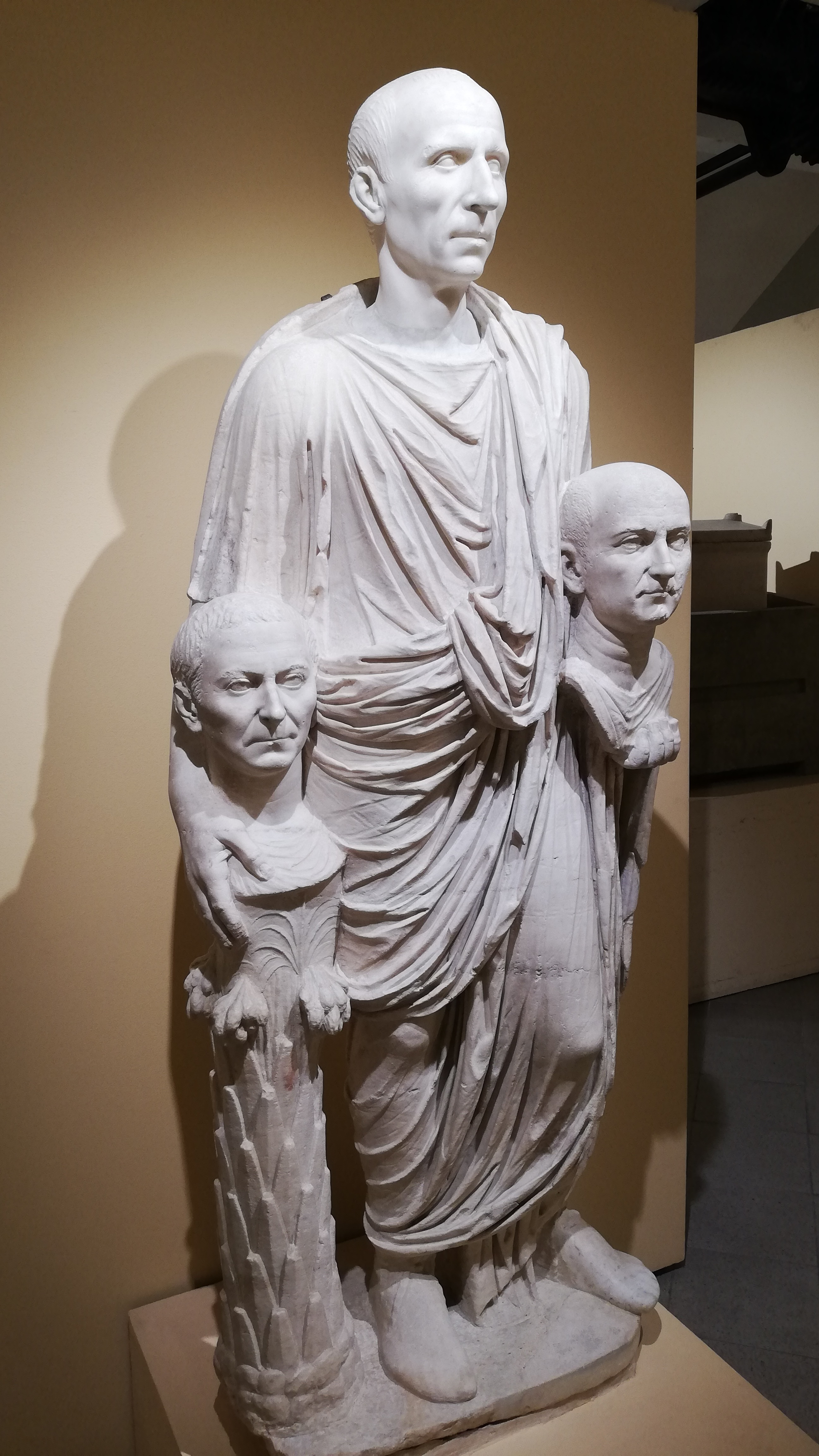
The so-called "Togatus Barberini", a statue depicting a Roman senator holding portrait effigies (possibly imagines) of deceased ancestors; marble, late 1st century BCE; head (not belonging): mid 1st century BCE.

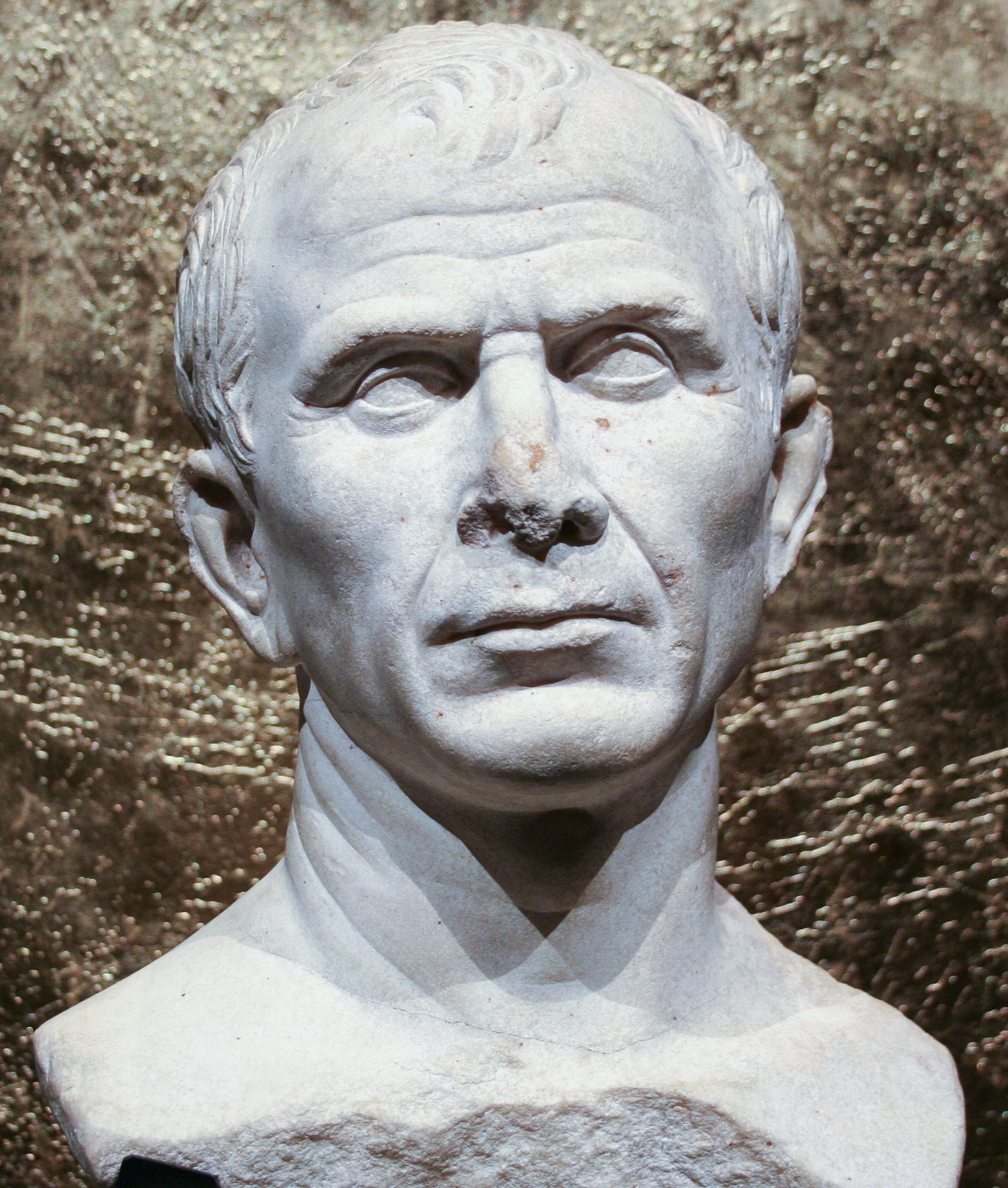
Arles bust, marble bust found in the Rhone River near Arles, c. 46 BCE

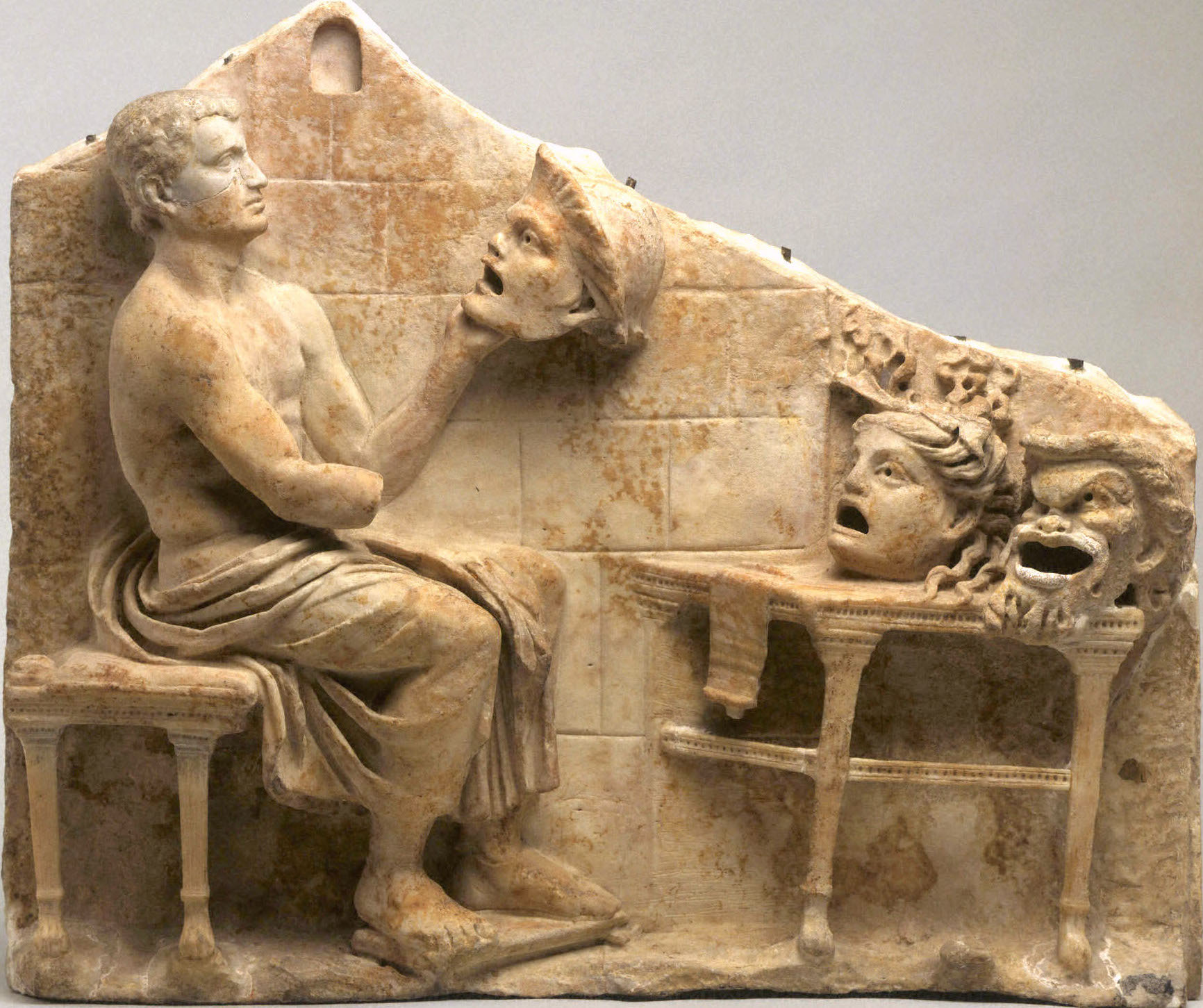
Roman, Republican or Early Imperial, Relief of a seated poet (Menander) with masks of New Comedy, 1st century BC – early 1st century AD, Princeton University Art Museum

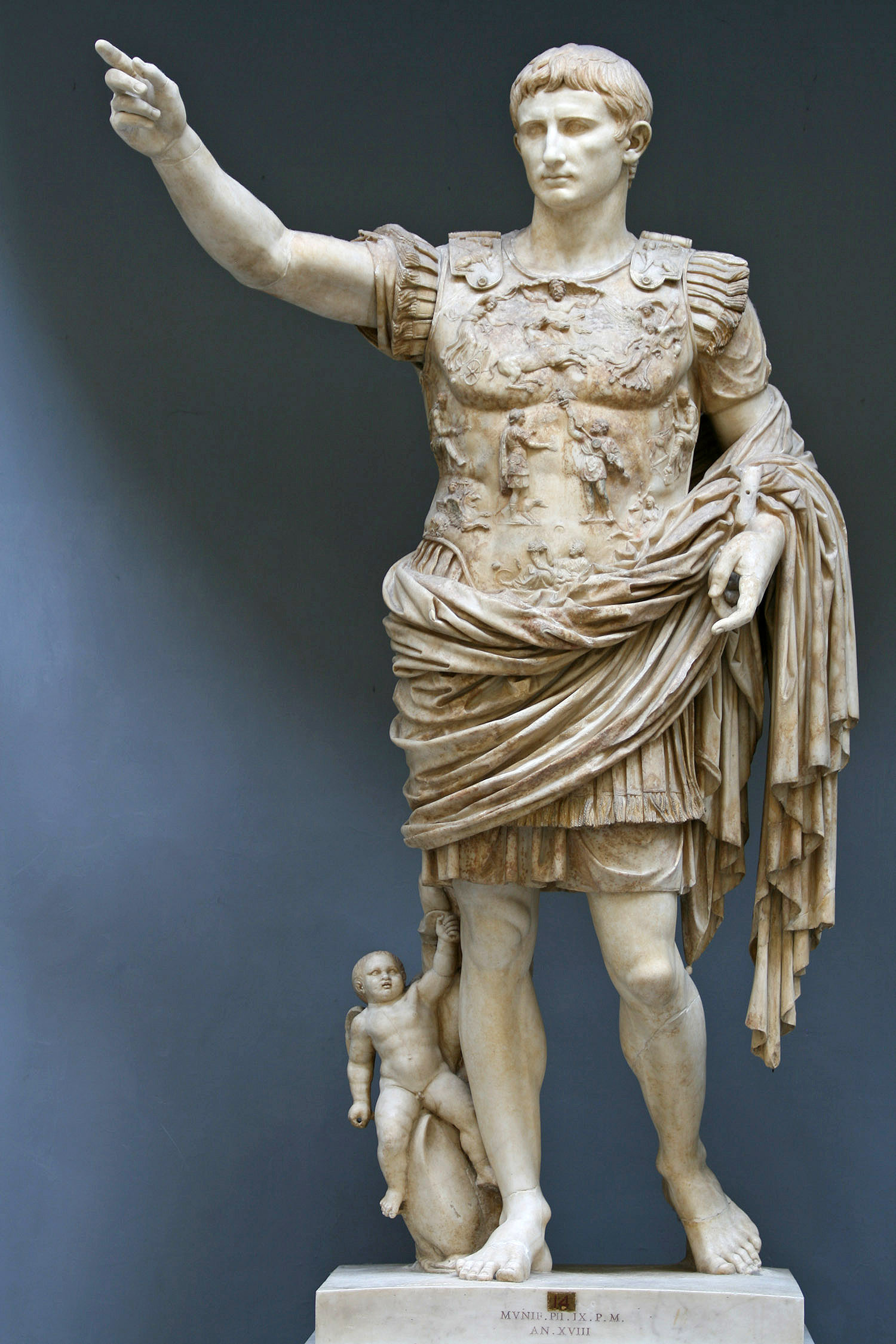
Augustus of Prima Porta, statue of the emperor Augustus, 1st century CE. Vatican Museums

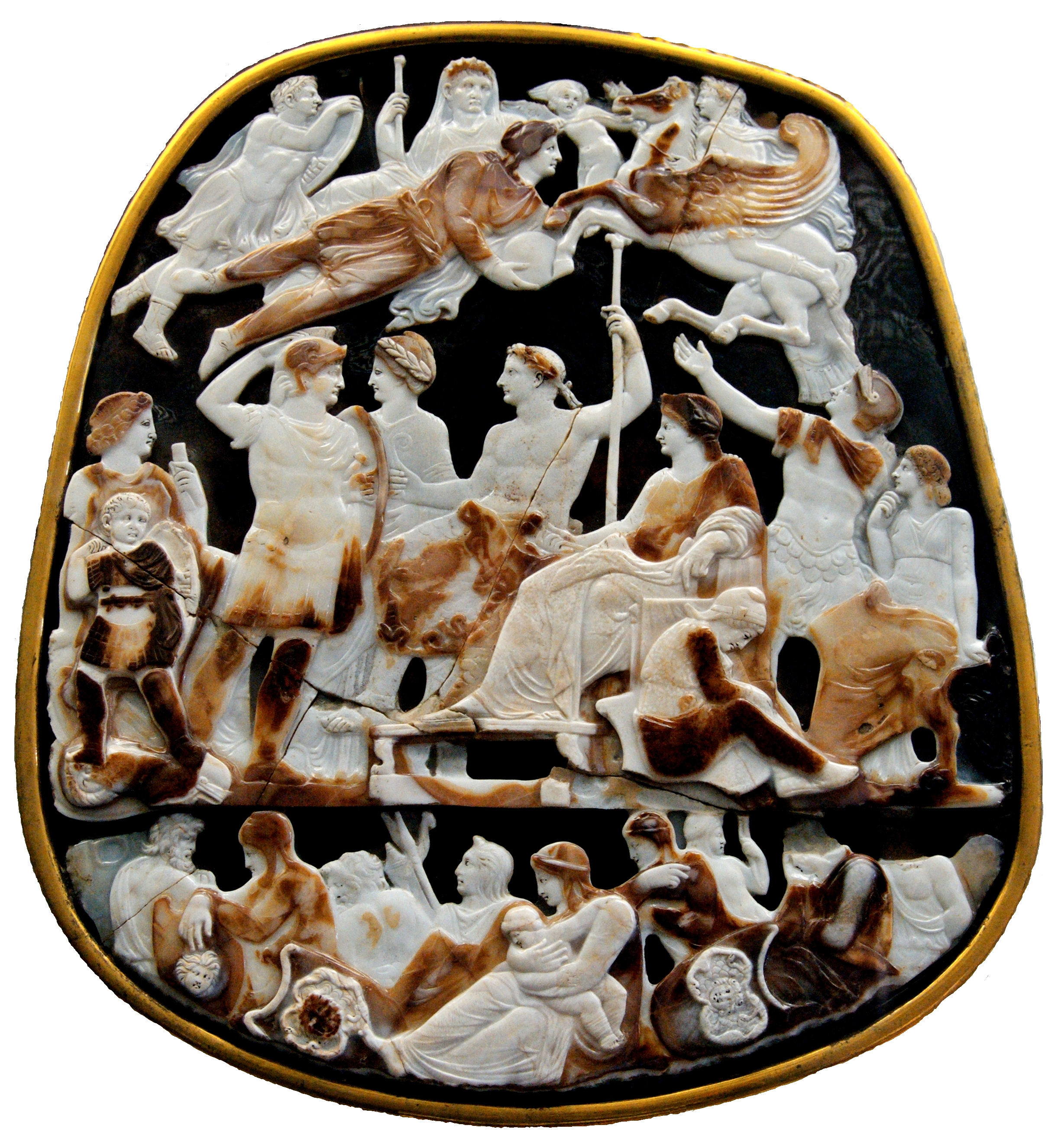
The cameo gem known as the "Great Cameo of France", c. 23 CE, with an allegory of Augustus and his family

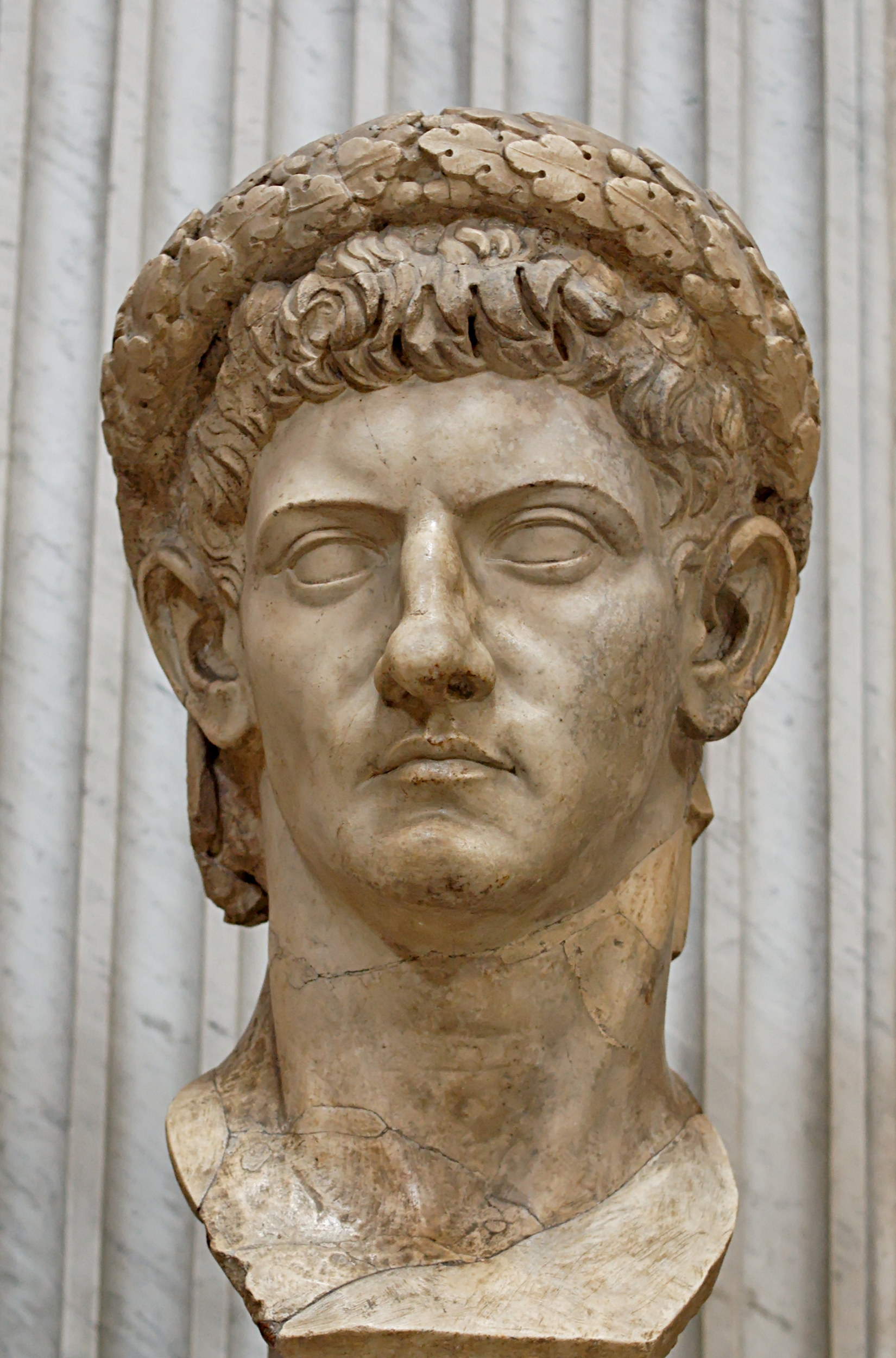
Bust of emperor Claudius, c. 50 CE, (reworked from a bust of emperor Caligula), It was found in the so-called Otricoli basilica in Lanuvium, Italy, Vatican Museums

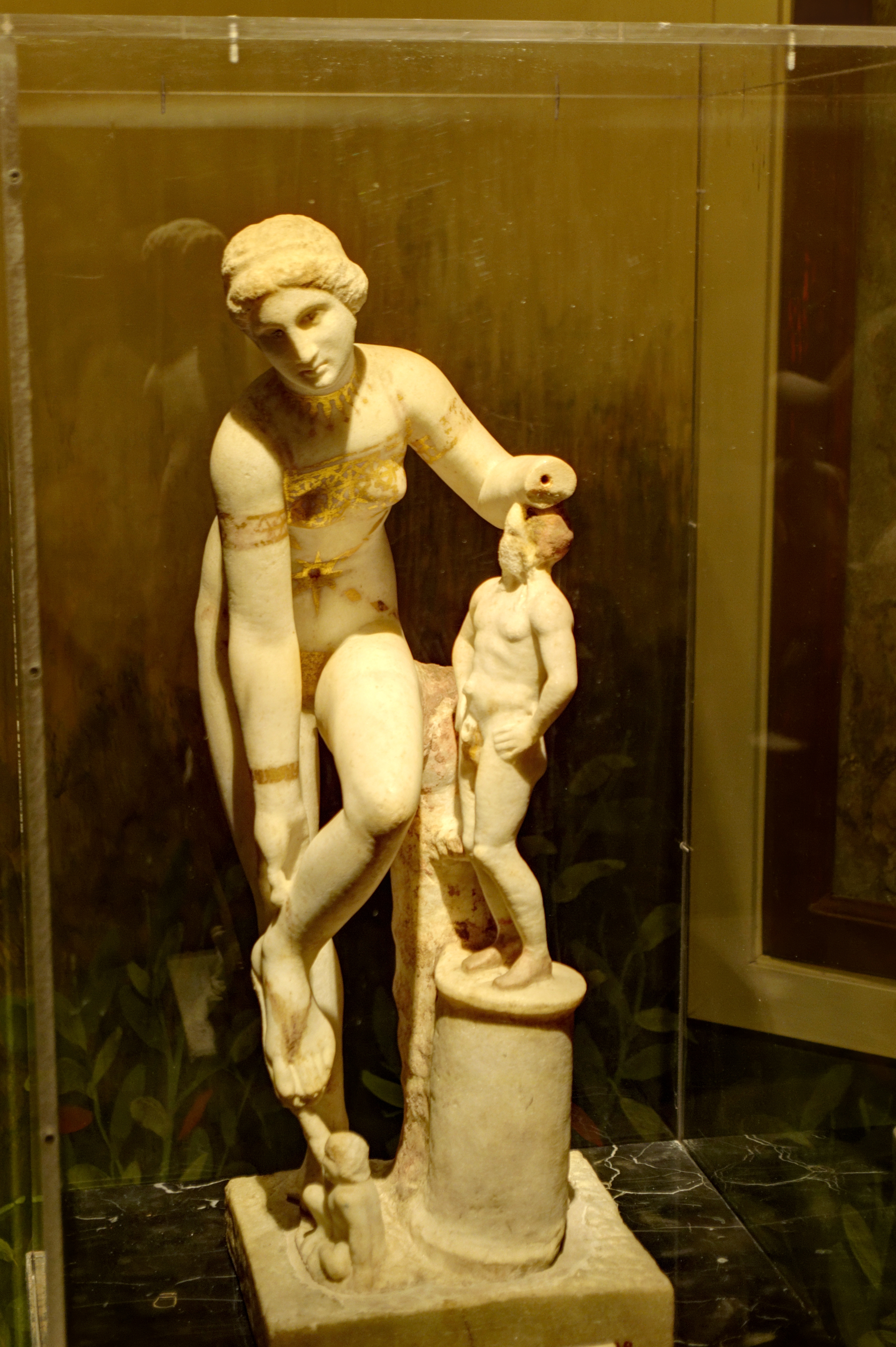
The so-called "Venus in a bikini", from the House of the Bikini, Pompeii, depicts her Greek counterpart Aphrodite as she is about to untie her sandal, with a small Eros squatting beneath her left arm

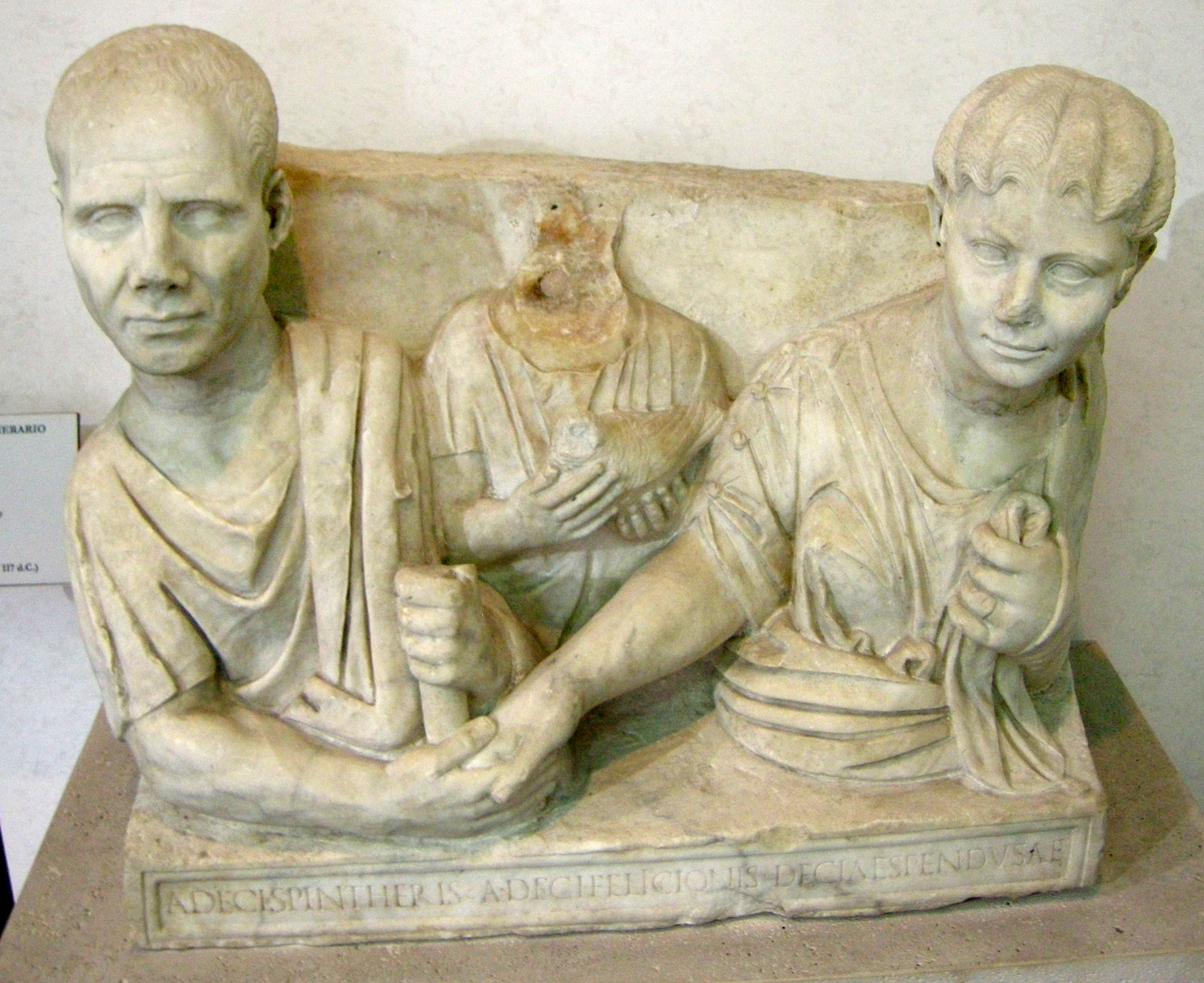
Tomb relief of the Decii, 98–117 CE

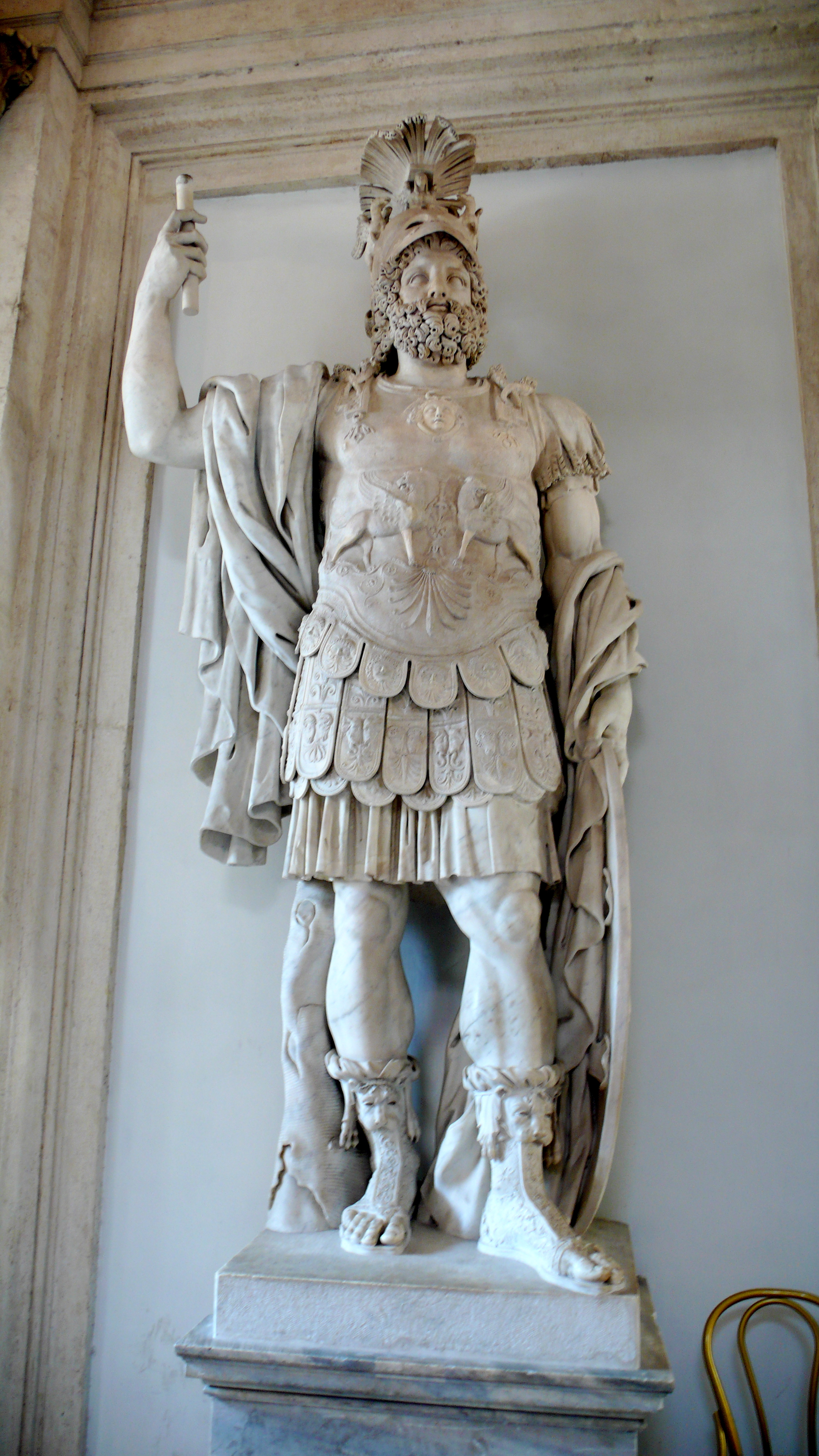
Statue of Mars from the Forum of Nerva, early 2nd century AD, based on an Augustan-era original that in turn used a Hellenistic Greek model of the 4th century BCE, Capitoline Museums

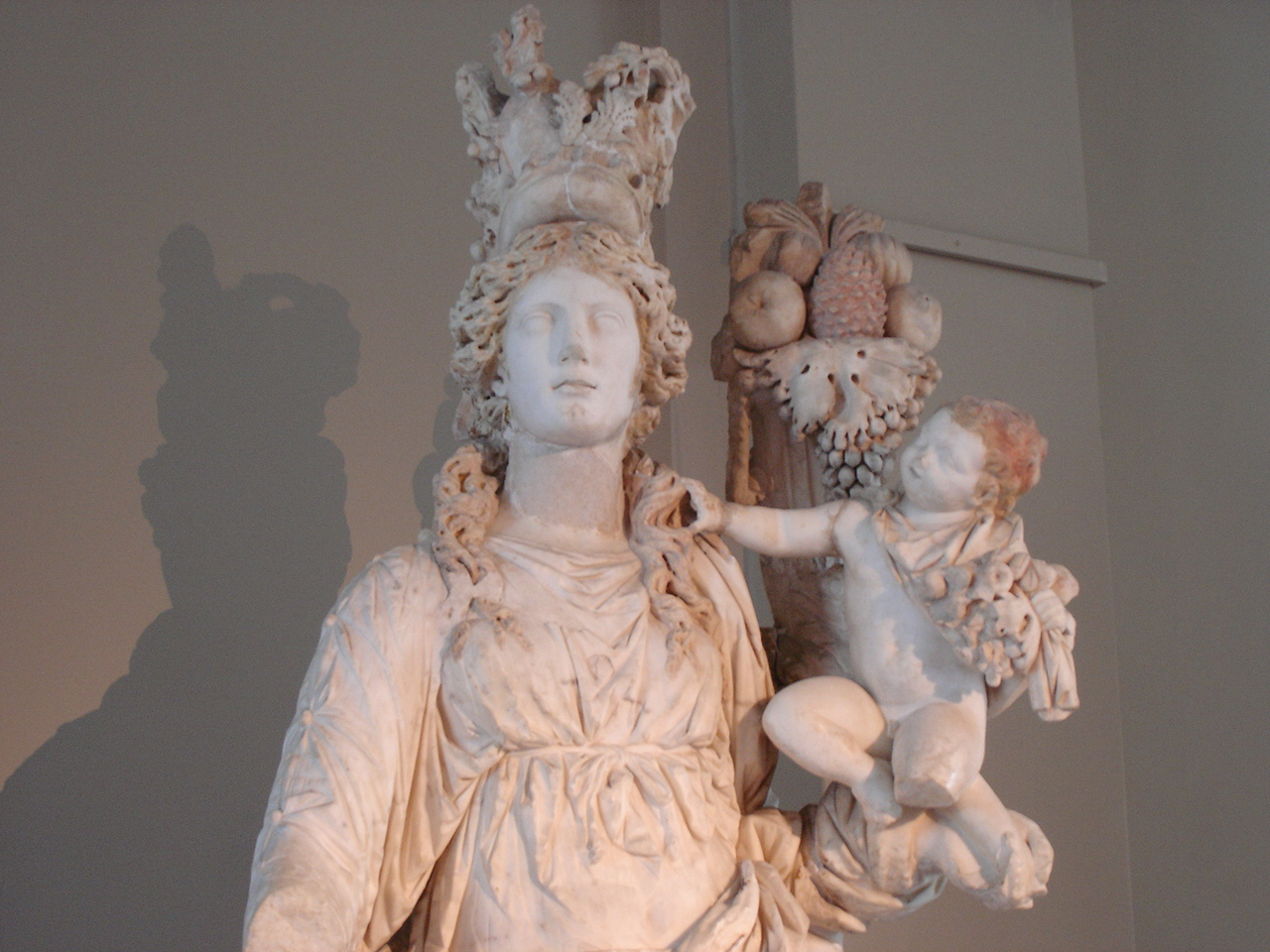
Polychrome marble statue depicting the goddess Tyche holding the infant Plutus in her arms, 2nd century AD, Istanbul Archaeological Museum

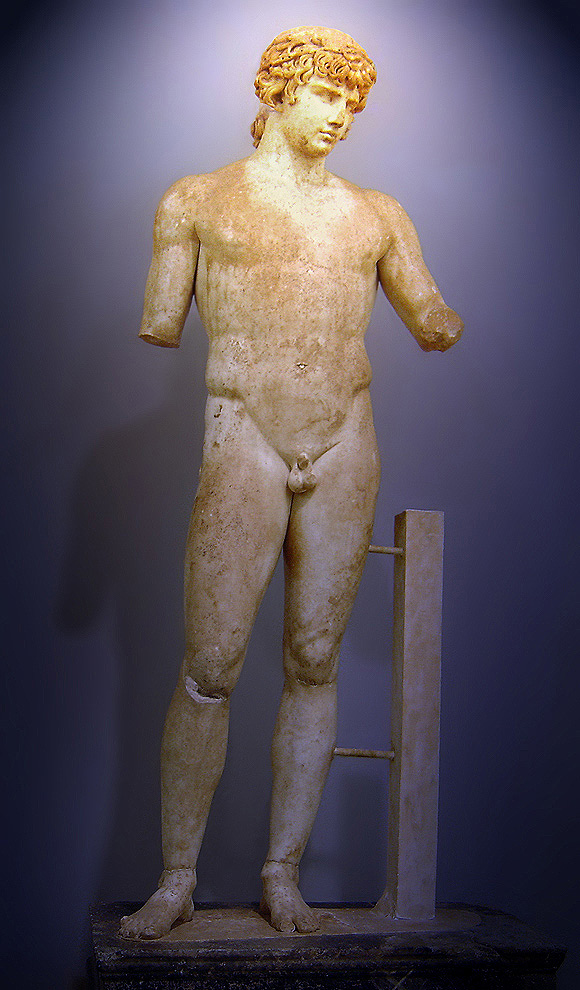
Statue of Antinous (Delphi), depicting Antinous, polychrome Parian marble, made during the reign of Hadrian (r. 117-138 AD)

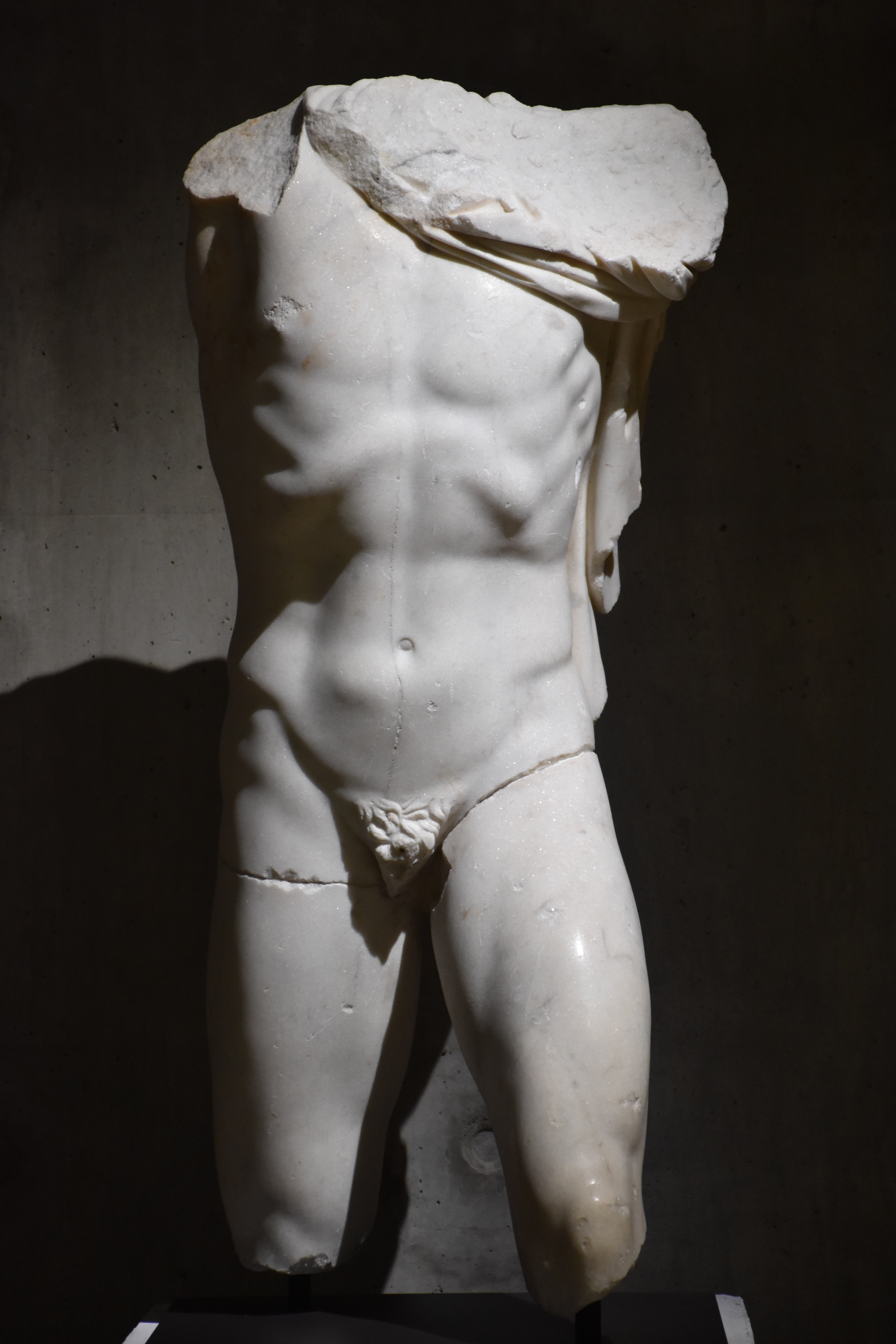
Male torso with legs to the knees, discovered on the site of the Odeon of Lyon in 1964. Marble. Lyon, Lugdunum

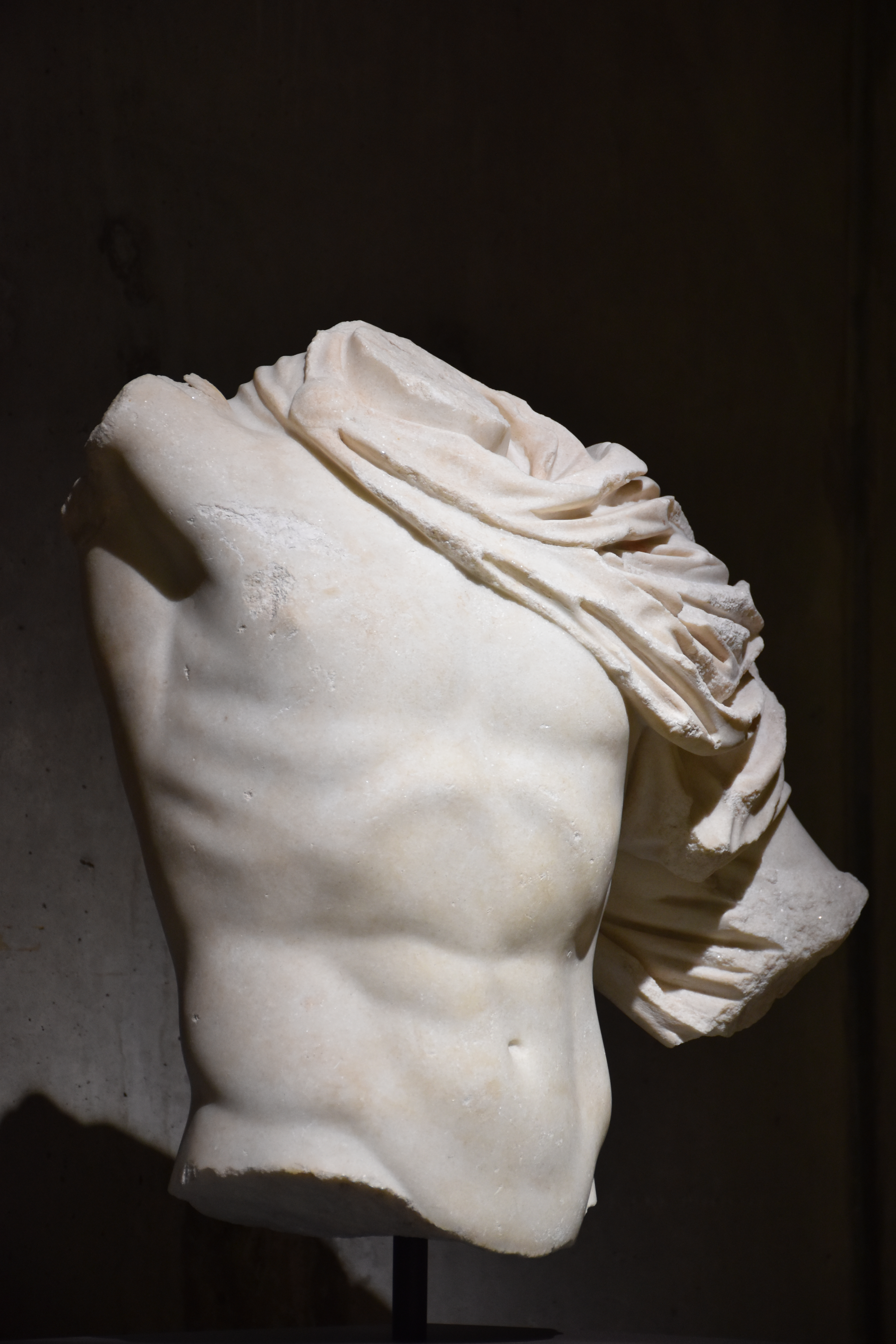
Male torso discovered on the site of the Odeon of Lyon in 1964. Marble. Lyon, Lugdunum.

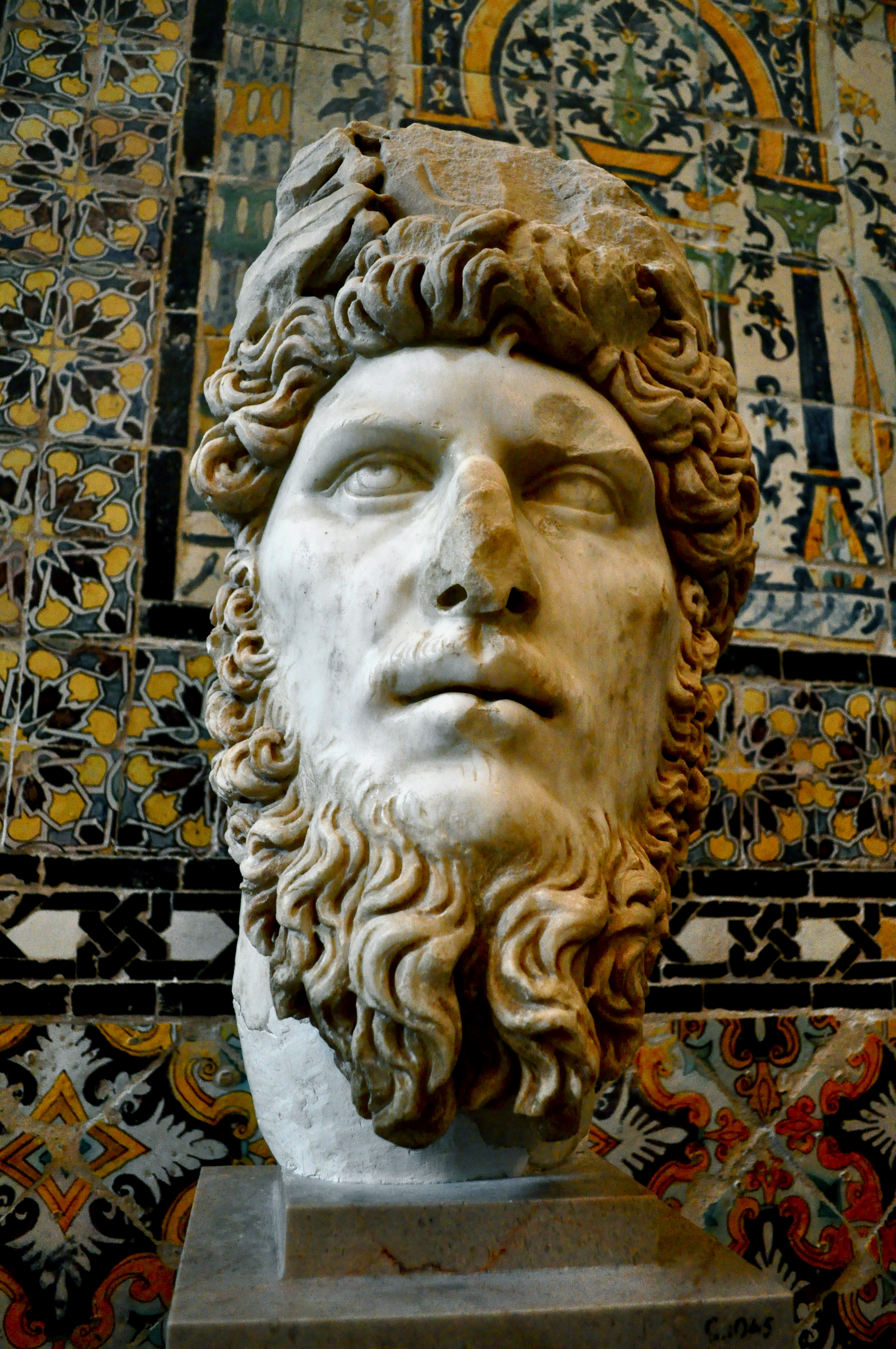
Bust of emperor Lucius Verus (r. 161–169), Bardo National Museum, Tunis

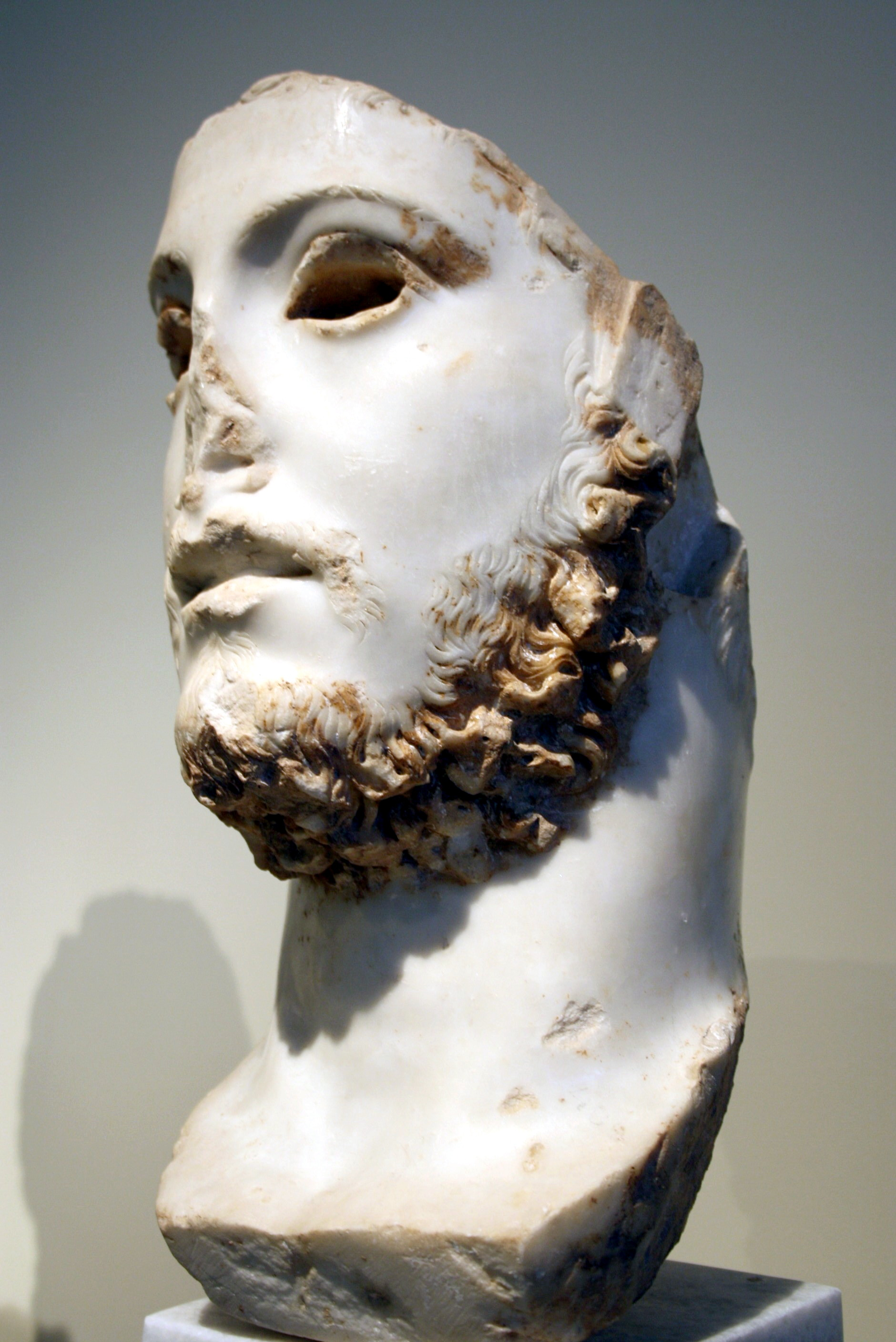
Remnants of a Roman bust of a youth with a blond beard, perhaps depicting emperor Commodus (r. 177–192), National Archaeological Museum, Athens

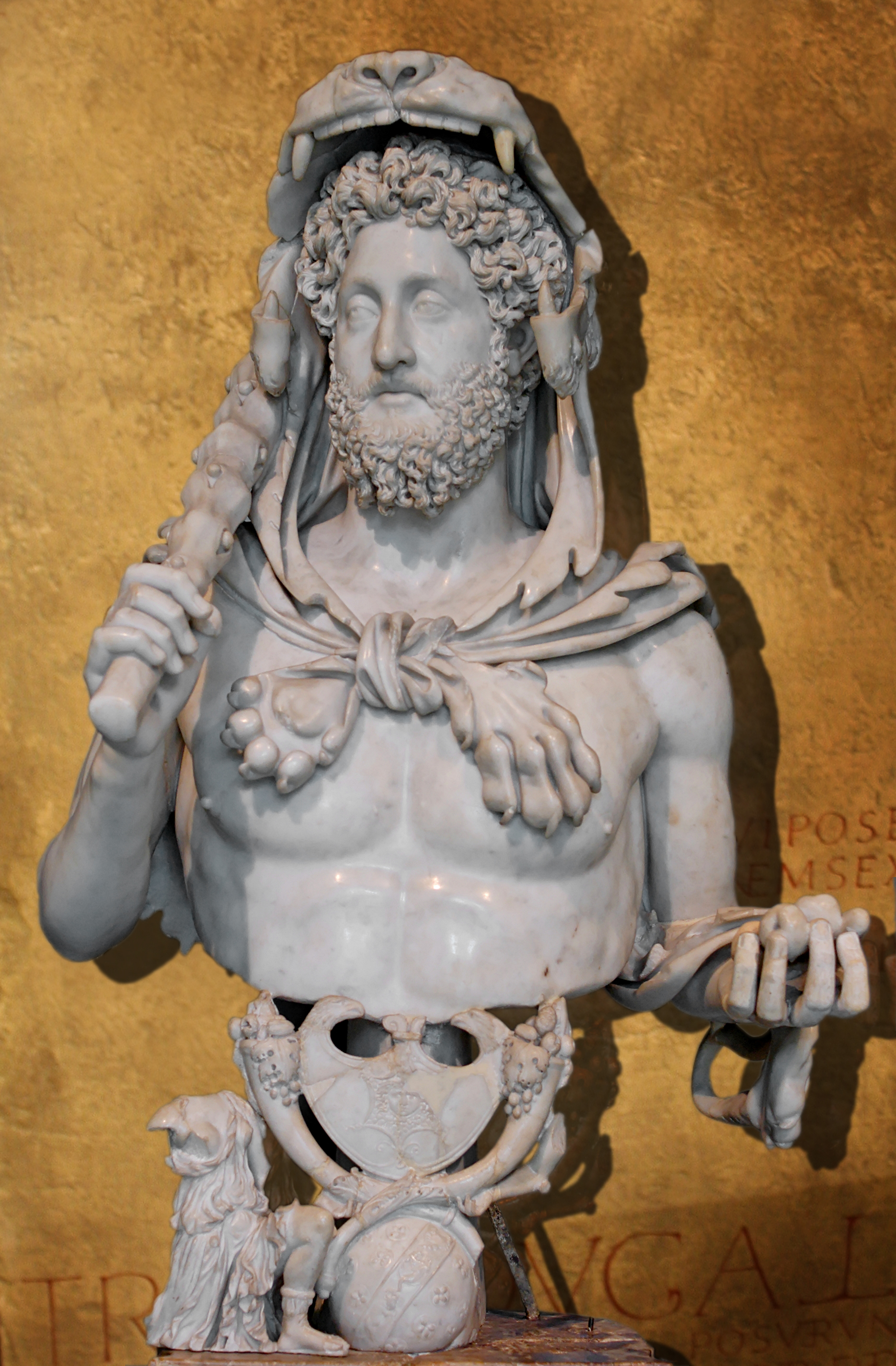
Commodus dressed as Hercules, c. 191 CE, in the late imperial "baroque" style

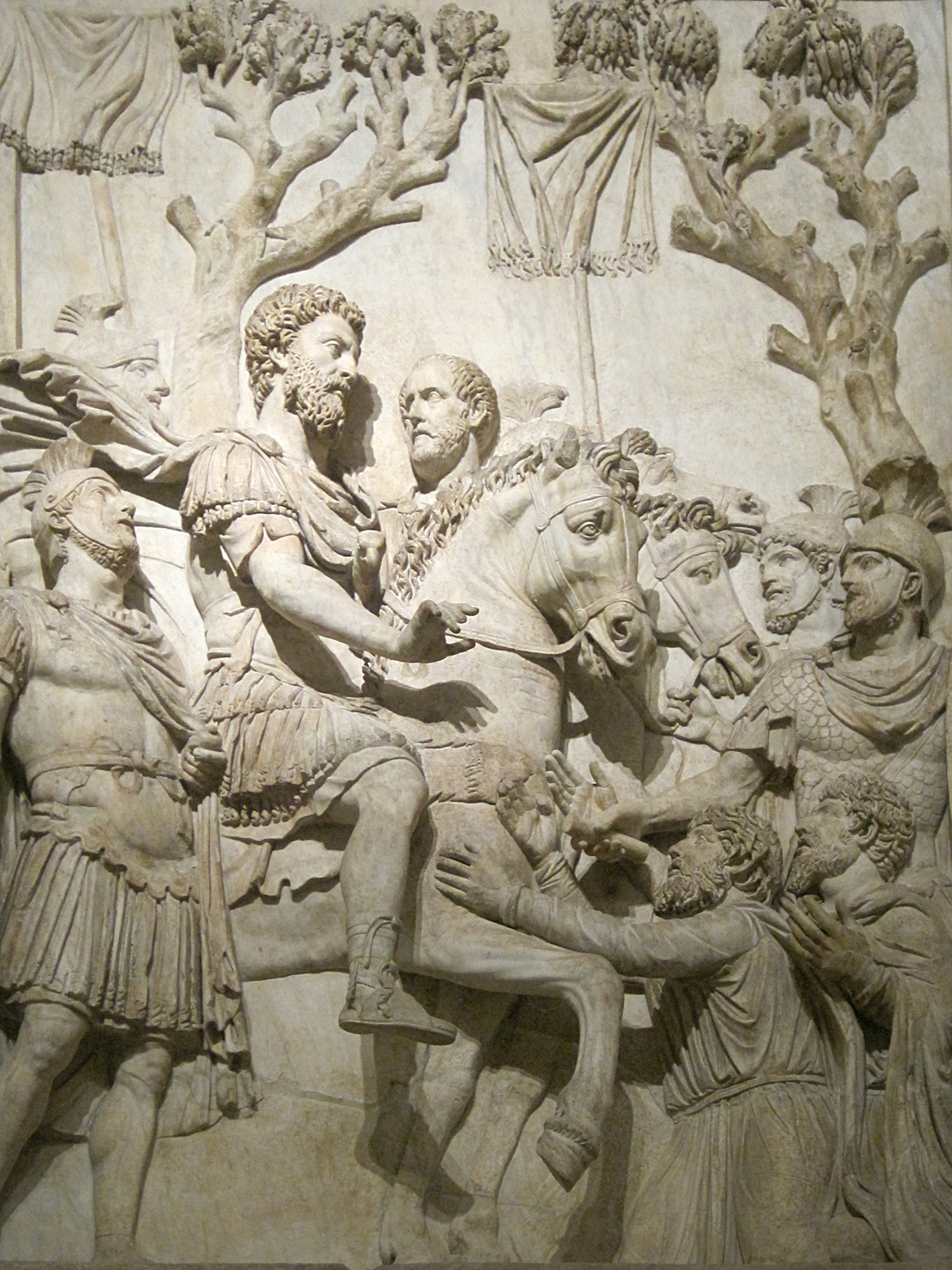
Marcus Aurelius receiving the submission of vanquished foes from the Marcomannic Wars, a relief from his now destroyed triumphal arch in Rome, Capitoline Museums, 177-180 AD

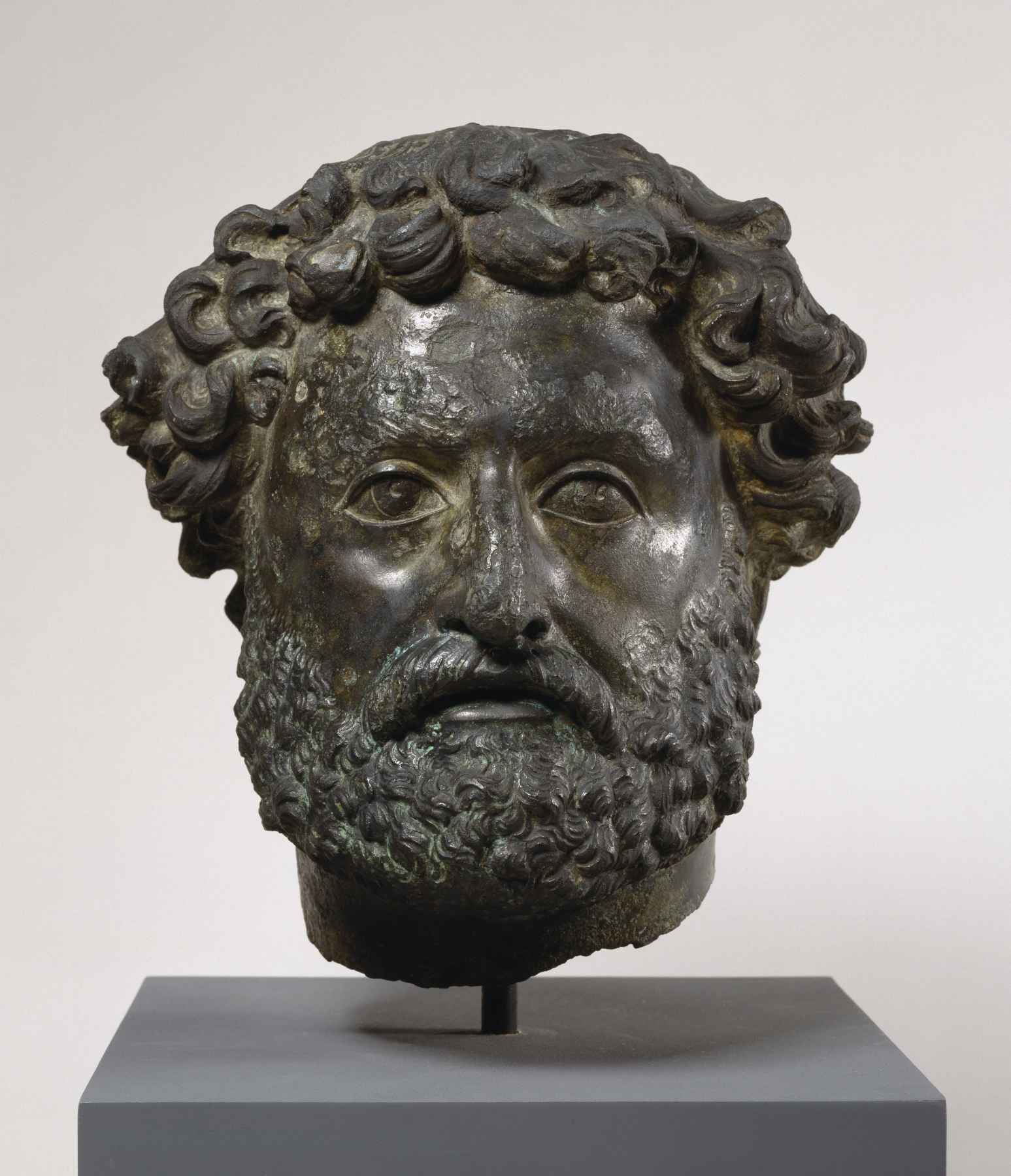
Private portrait with both individualized and unforgiving naturalism and stylized influence of portraits of the emperors Hadrian and Antoninus Pius in his beard and hairstyle.

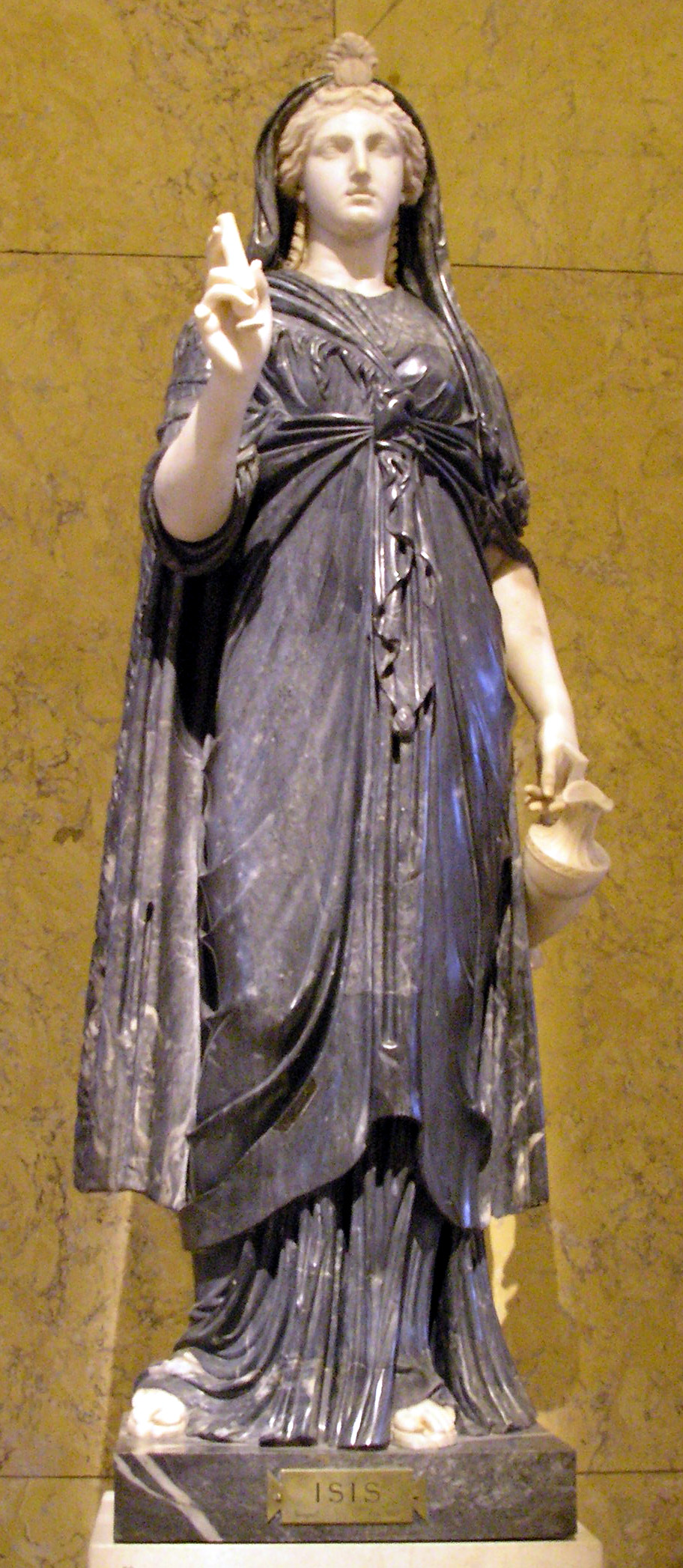
Ancient Roman statue of Isis, in the Collection of Greek and Roman Antiquities in the Kunsthistorisches Museum, Vienna; first half of the 2nd century AD, found in Naples, Italy; made out of black and white marble.

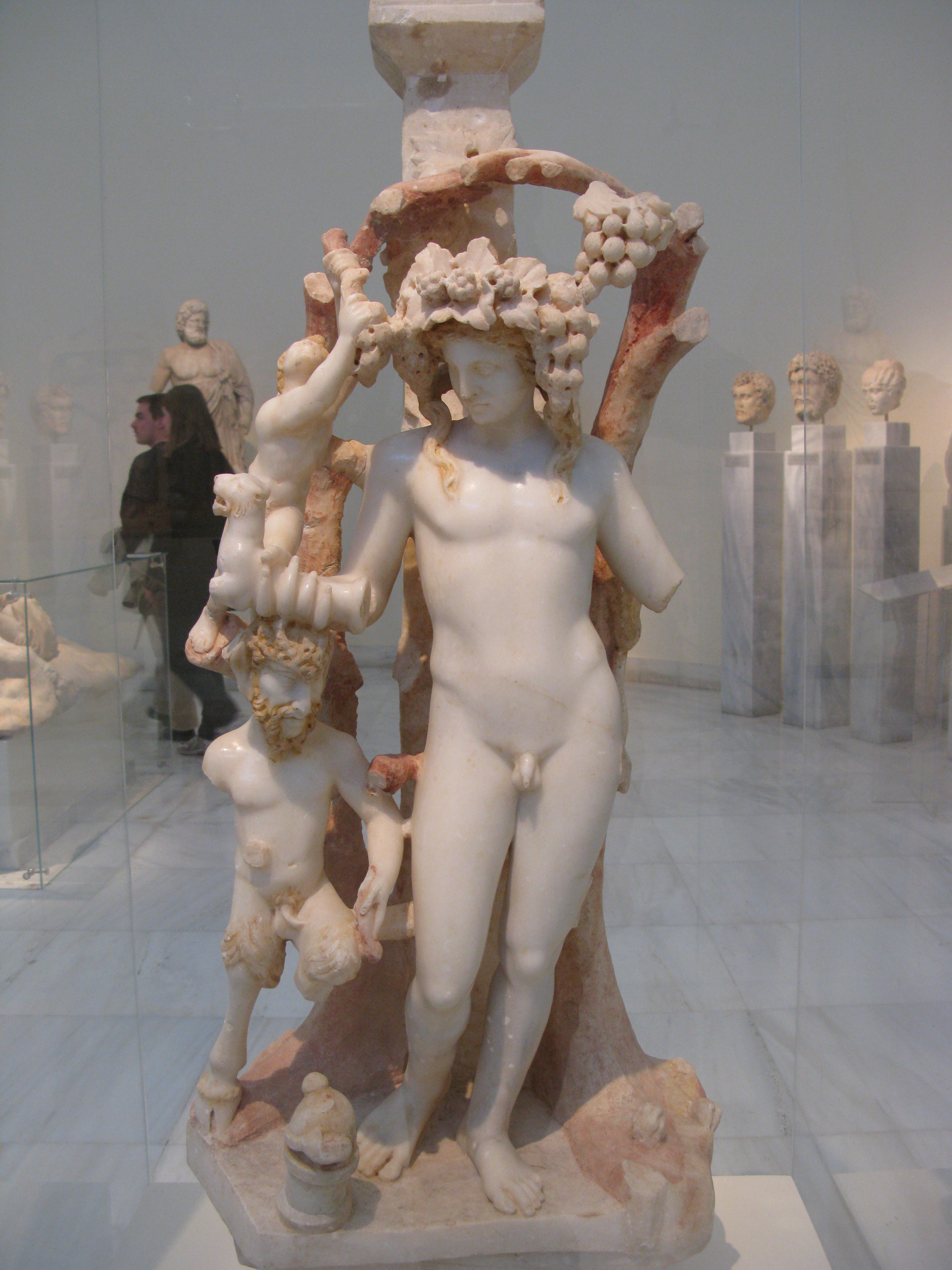
Marble table support adorned by a group including Dionysos, Pan and a Satyr; Dionysos holds a rhyton in the shape of a panther; traces of red and yellow colour are preserved on the hair of the figures and the branches; from an Asia Minor workshop, 170-180 AD, National Archaeological Museum, Athens, Greece

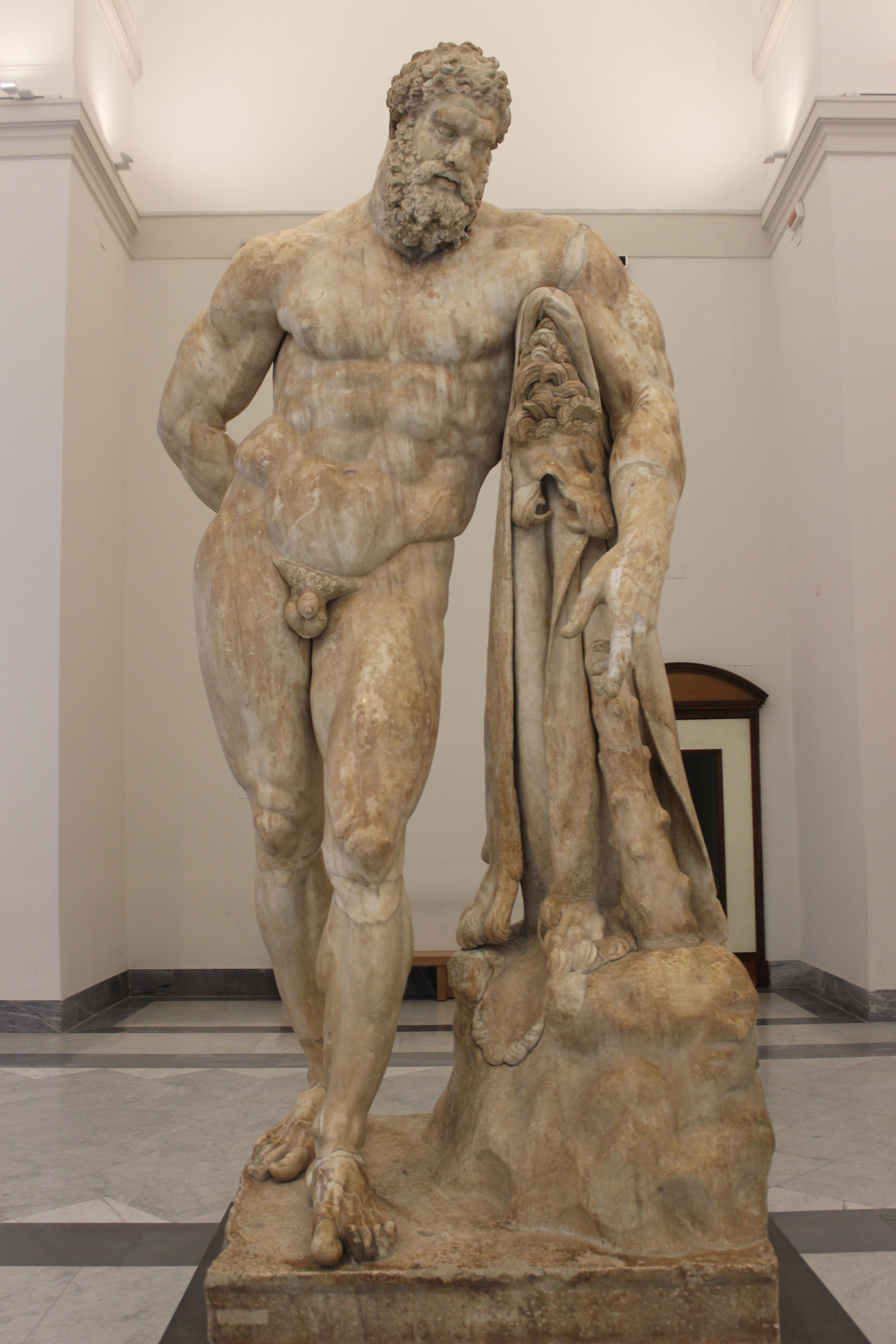
The Farnese Hercules, probably an enlarged copy made in the early 3rd century AD and signed by a certain Glykon, from an original by Lysippos (or one of his circle) that would have been made in the 4th century BC; The copy was made for the Baths of Caracalla in Rome (dedicated in 216 AD), where it was recovered in 1546

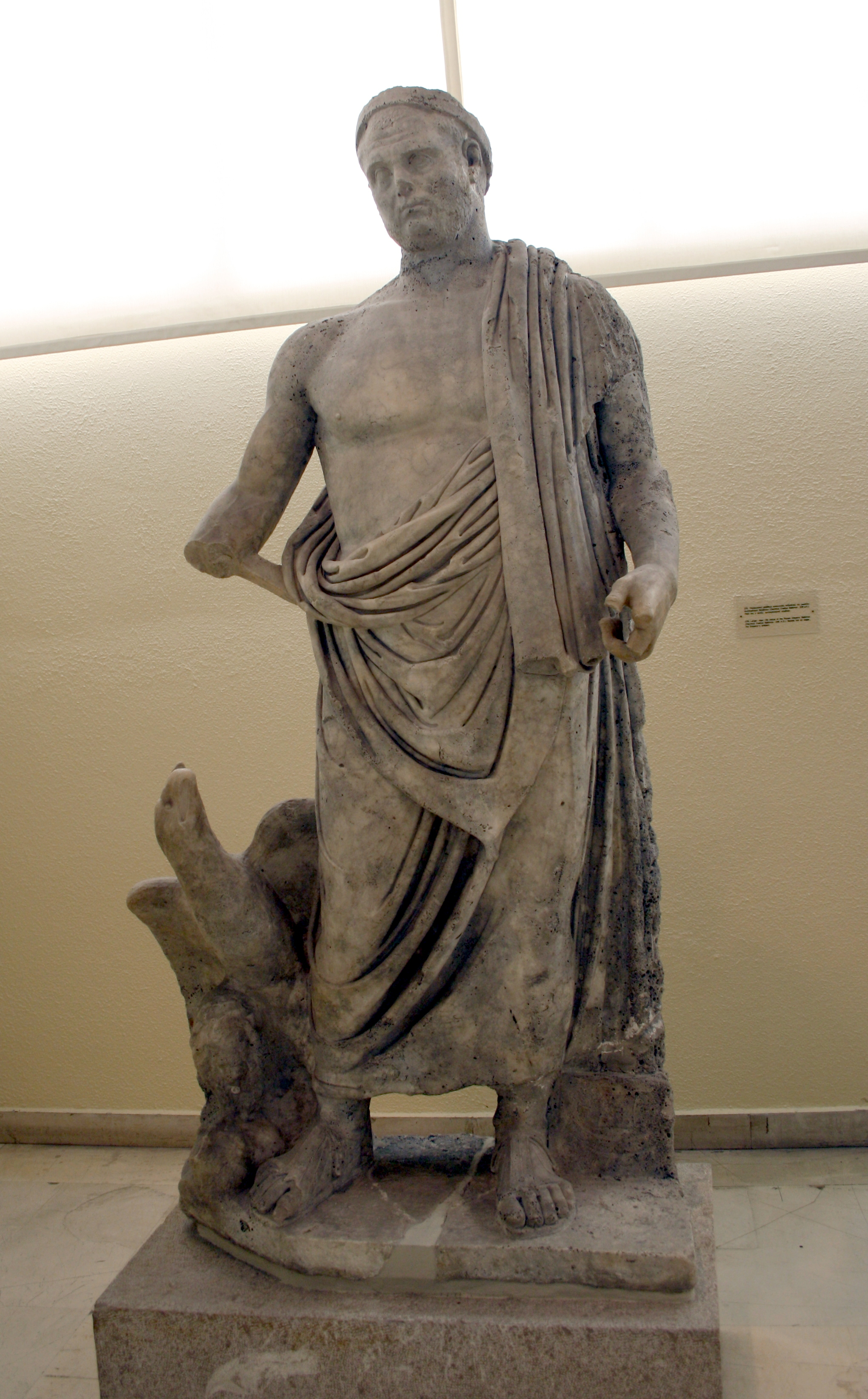
Ancient Roman statue of emperor Balbinus, dating from 238 AD, on display in the Archaeological Museum of Piraeus (Athens)

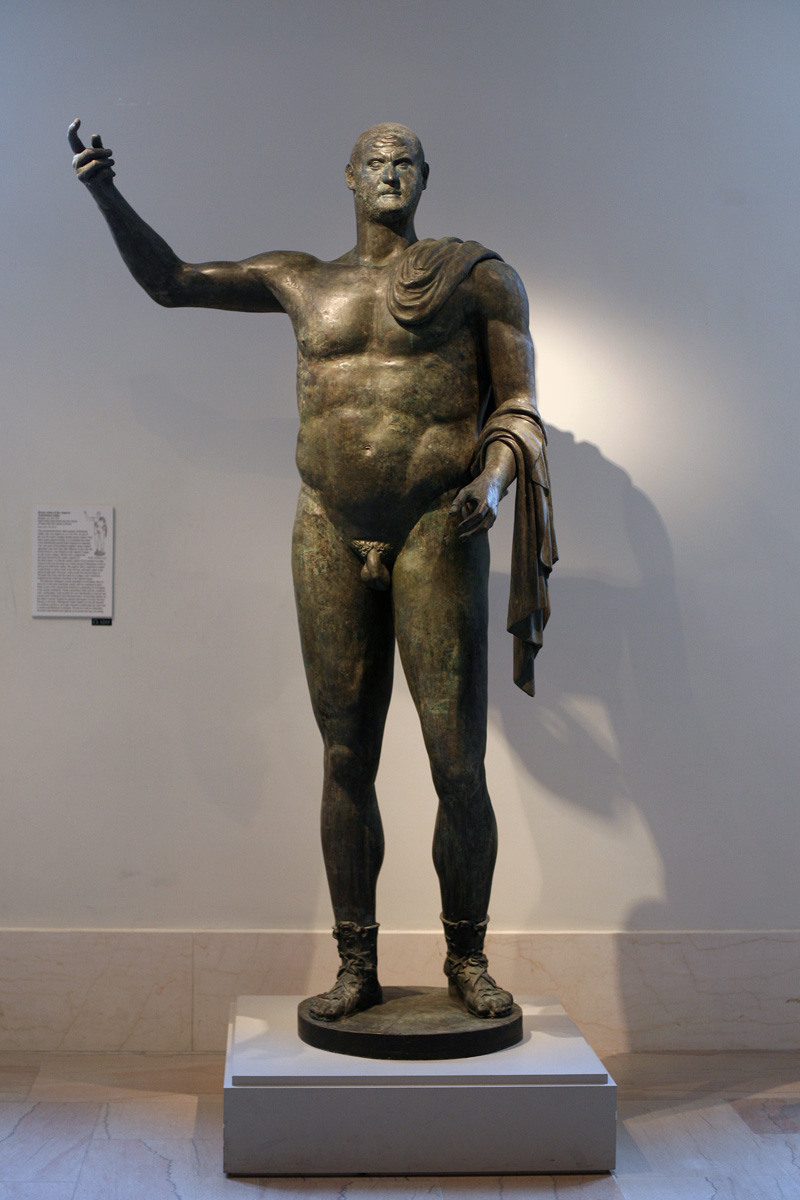
Bronze of Trebonianus Gallus dating from the time of his reign as Roman Emperor, the only surviving near-complete full-size 3rd-century Roman bronze (Metropolitan Museum of Art)

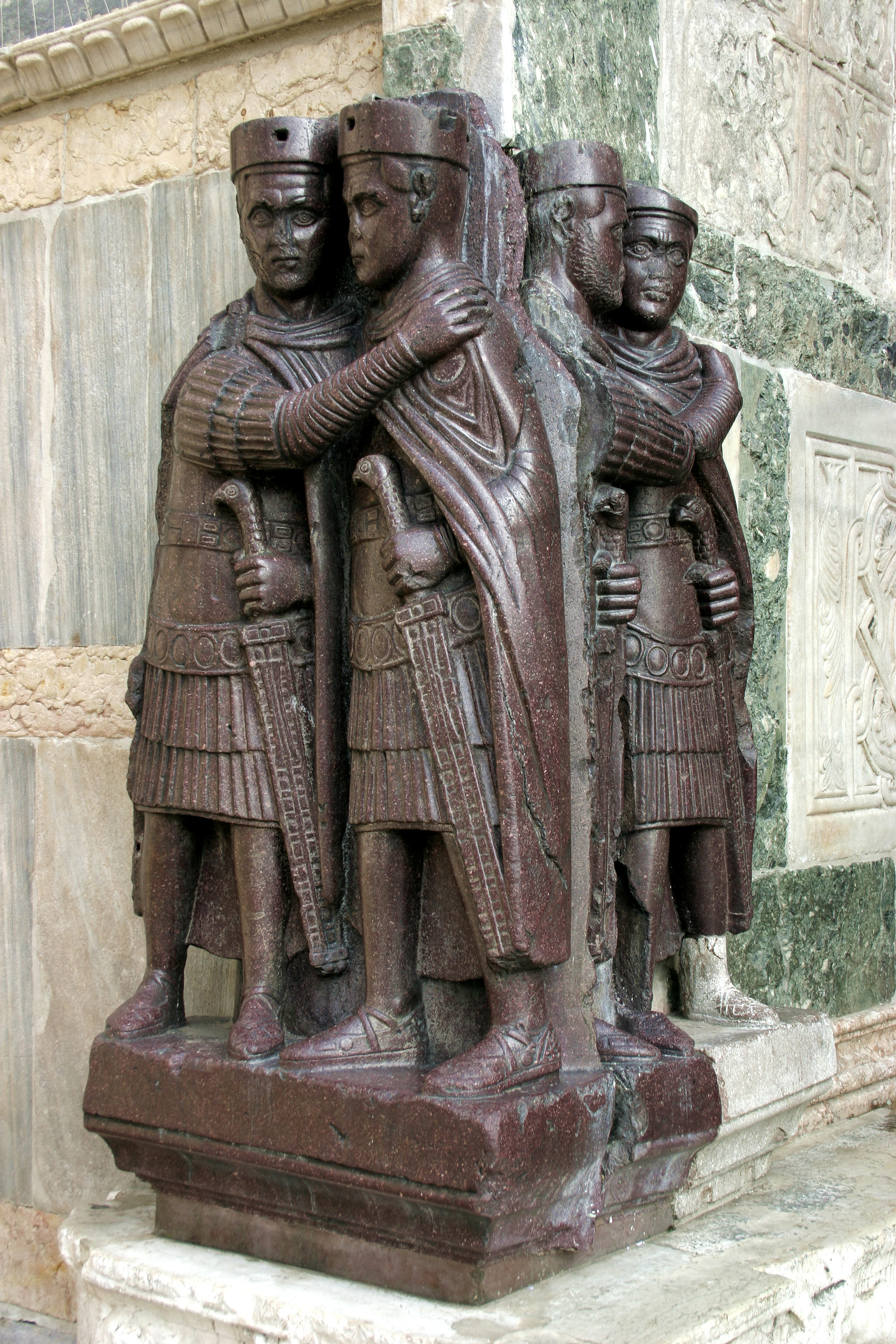
The Four Tetrarchs, c. 305, showing the new anti-classical style, in porphyry, now San Marco, Venice

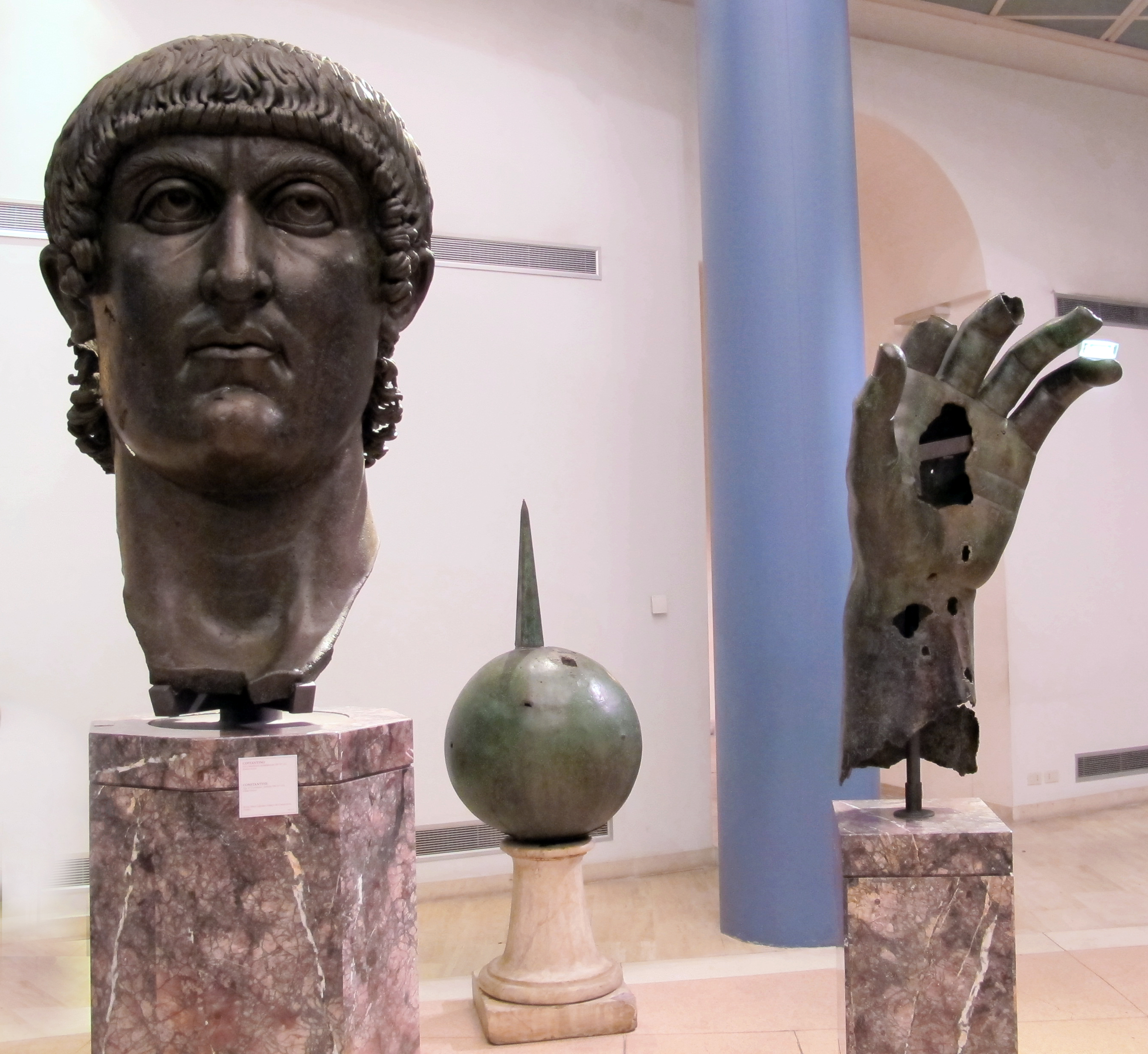
Head and other fragments a colossal bronze statue of Constantine I, early 4th century AD, Musei Capitolini (Rome)

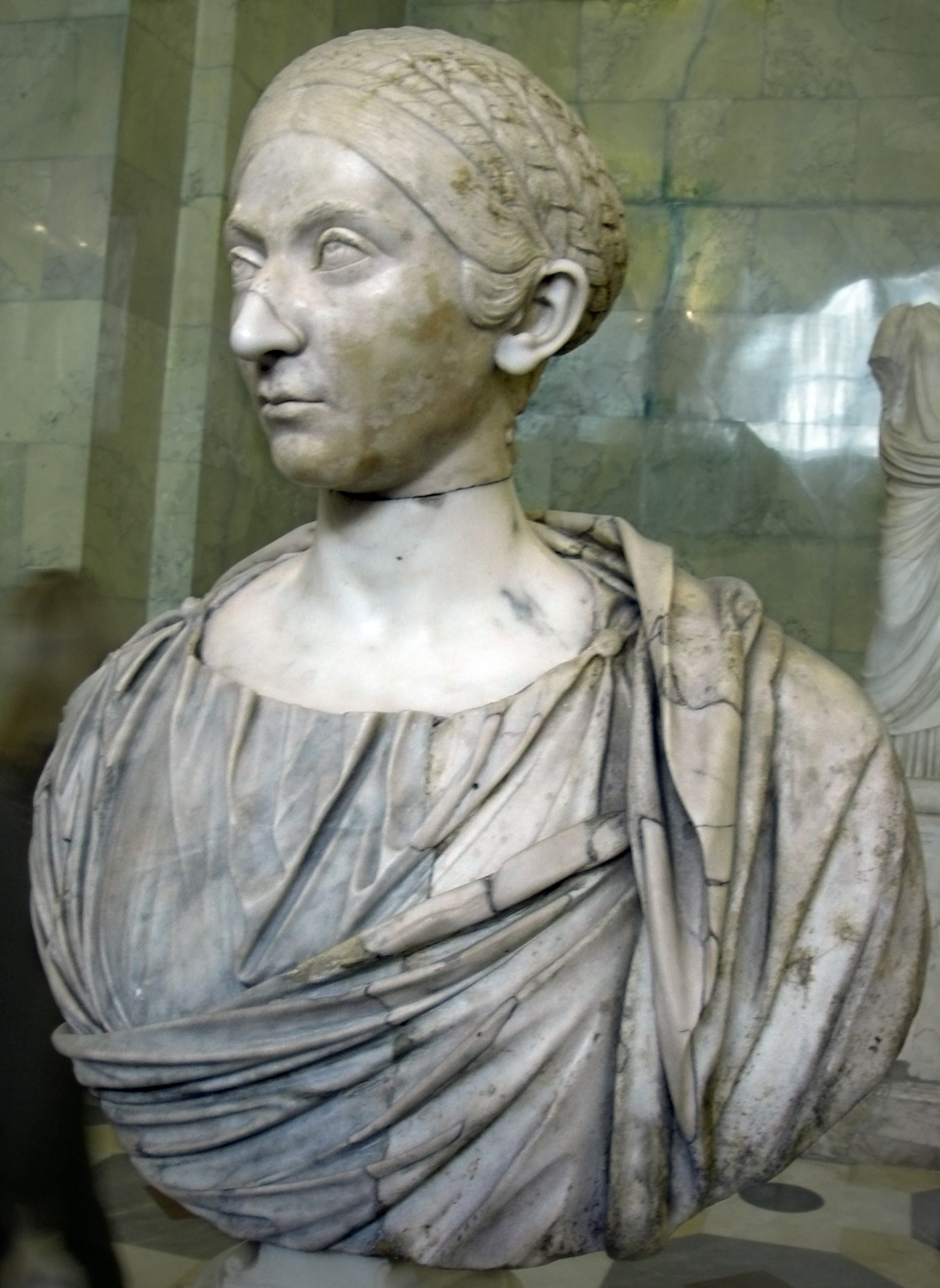
A marble portrait bust of a Roman matron, early 4th century AD, Hermitage Museum, St. Petersburg

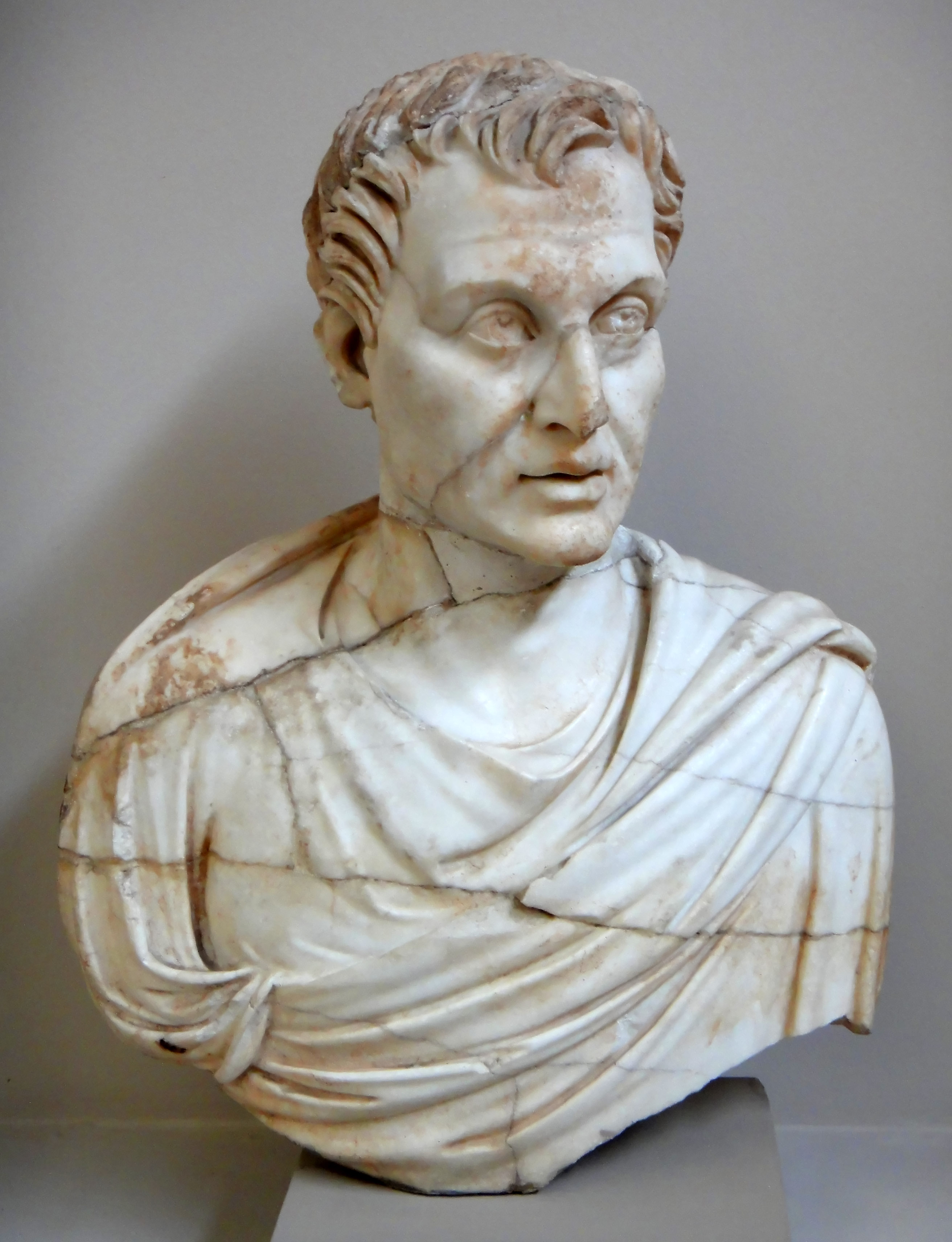
Bust depicting an idealized portrait of Menander of Ephesus, 4th century AD, Ephesus Archaeological Museum

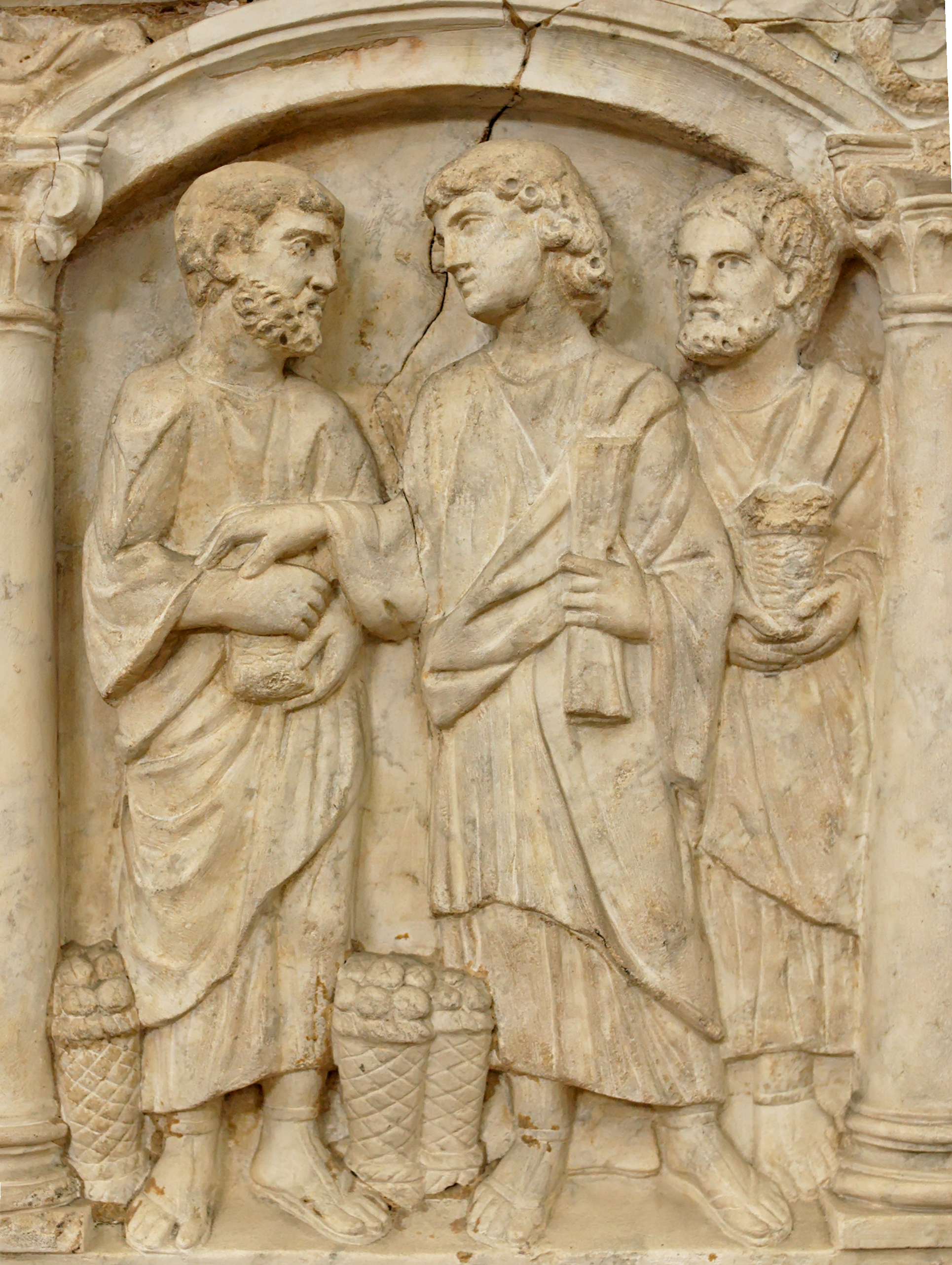
Detail of a sarcophagus depicting the Christian belief in the multiplication of bread loaves and fish by Jesus Christ, c. 350-375 AD, Vatican Museums

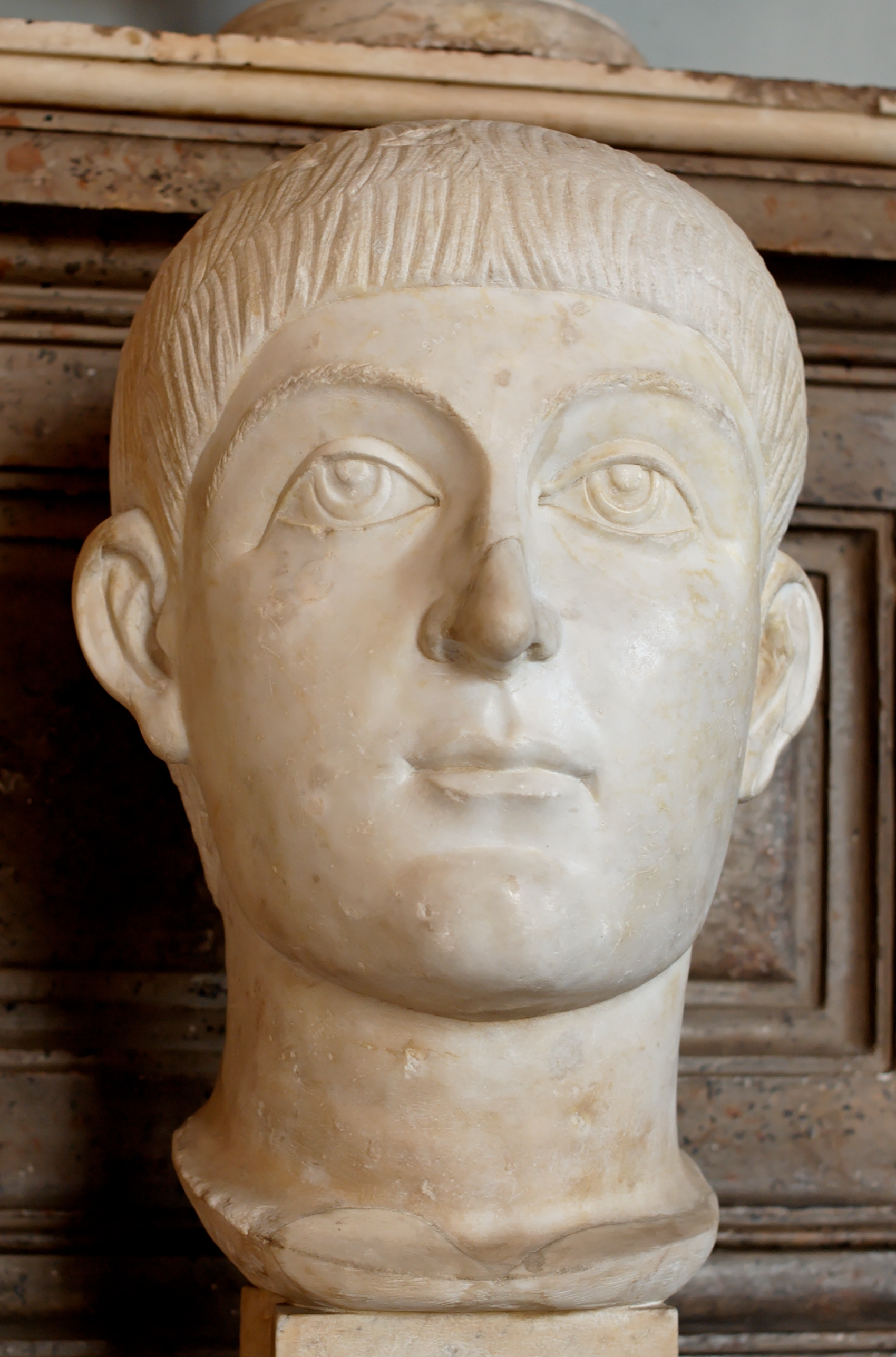
A Roman bust depicting either Valens or Honorius; marble, ca. 400 AD

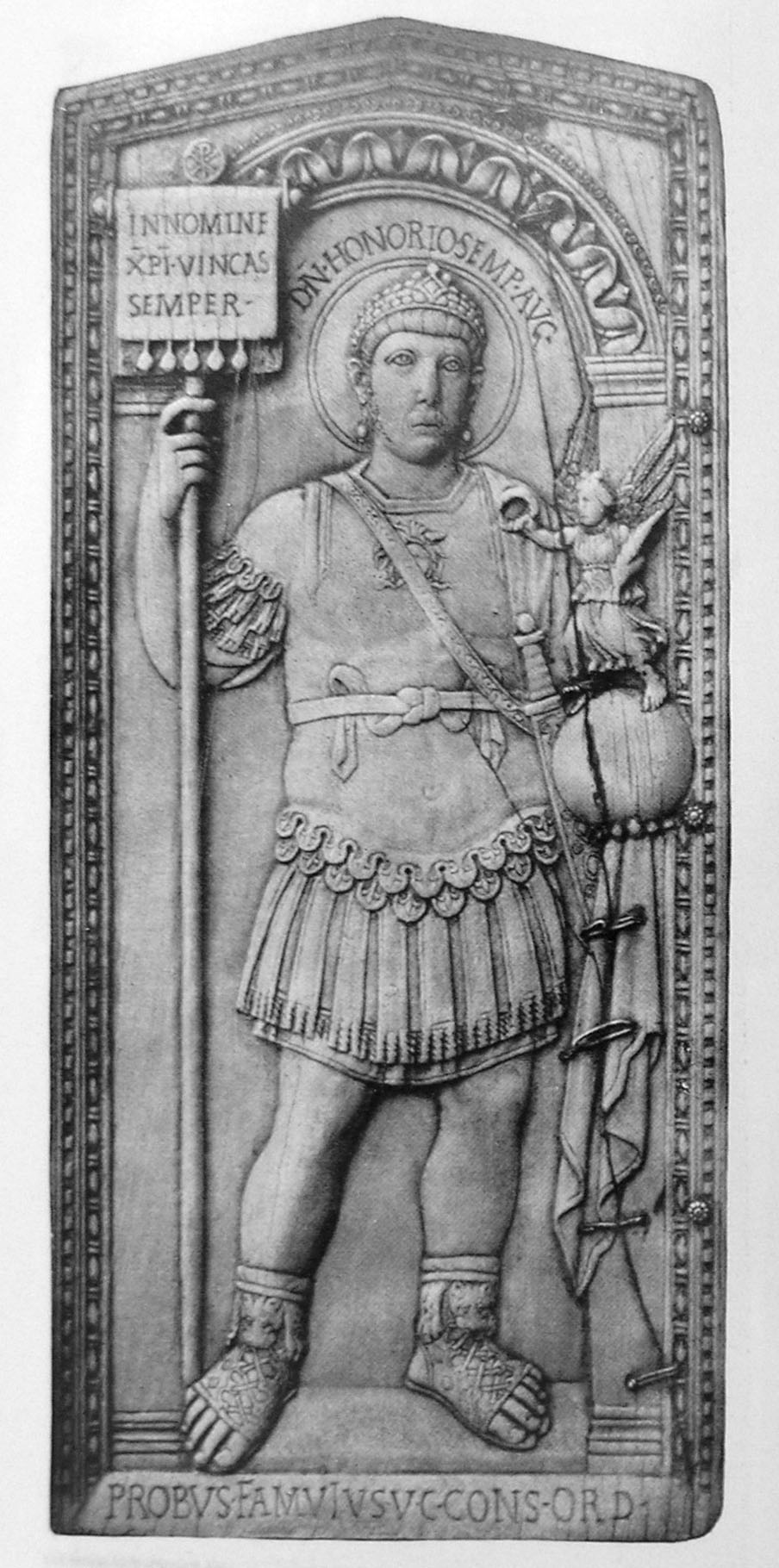
Honorius on the consular diptych of Anicius Petronius Probus (406 AD)

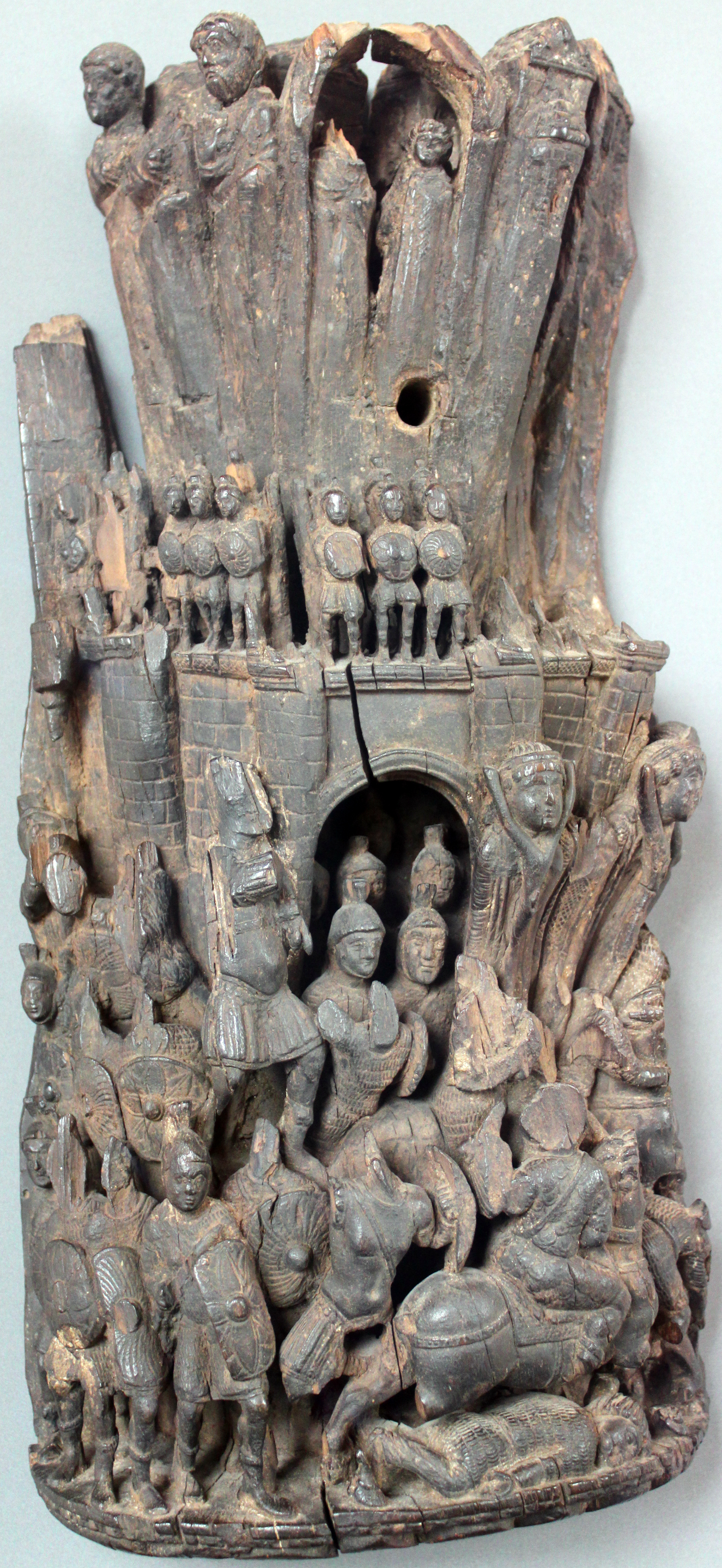
Boxwood relief depicting the liberation of a besieged city by a relief force, with those defending the walls making a sortie; Western Roman Empire, early 5th century AD

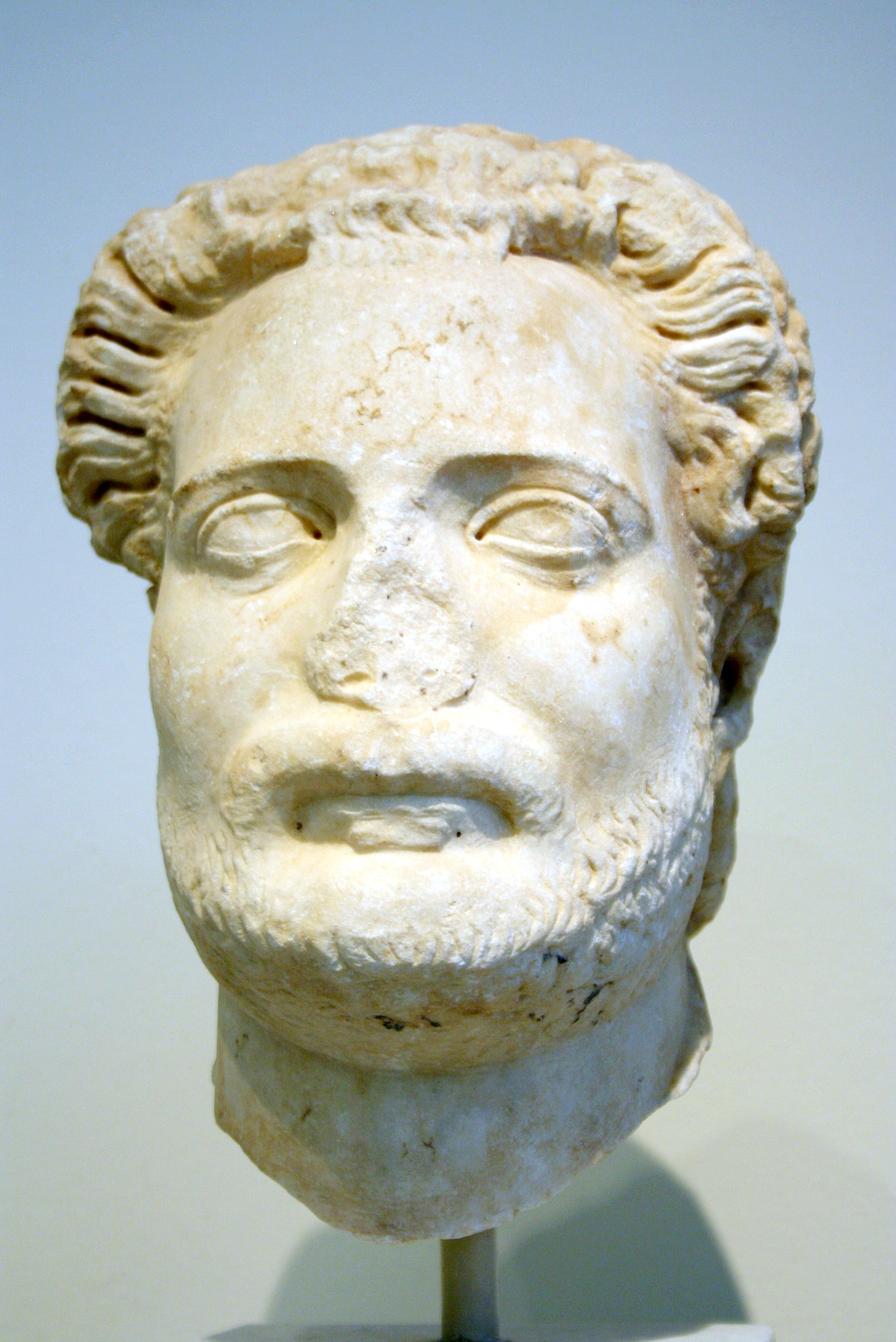
Portrait of an unknown man, found in the Agora of Athens, dating from around 400-450 AD; National Archaeological Museum, Athens

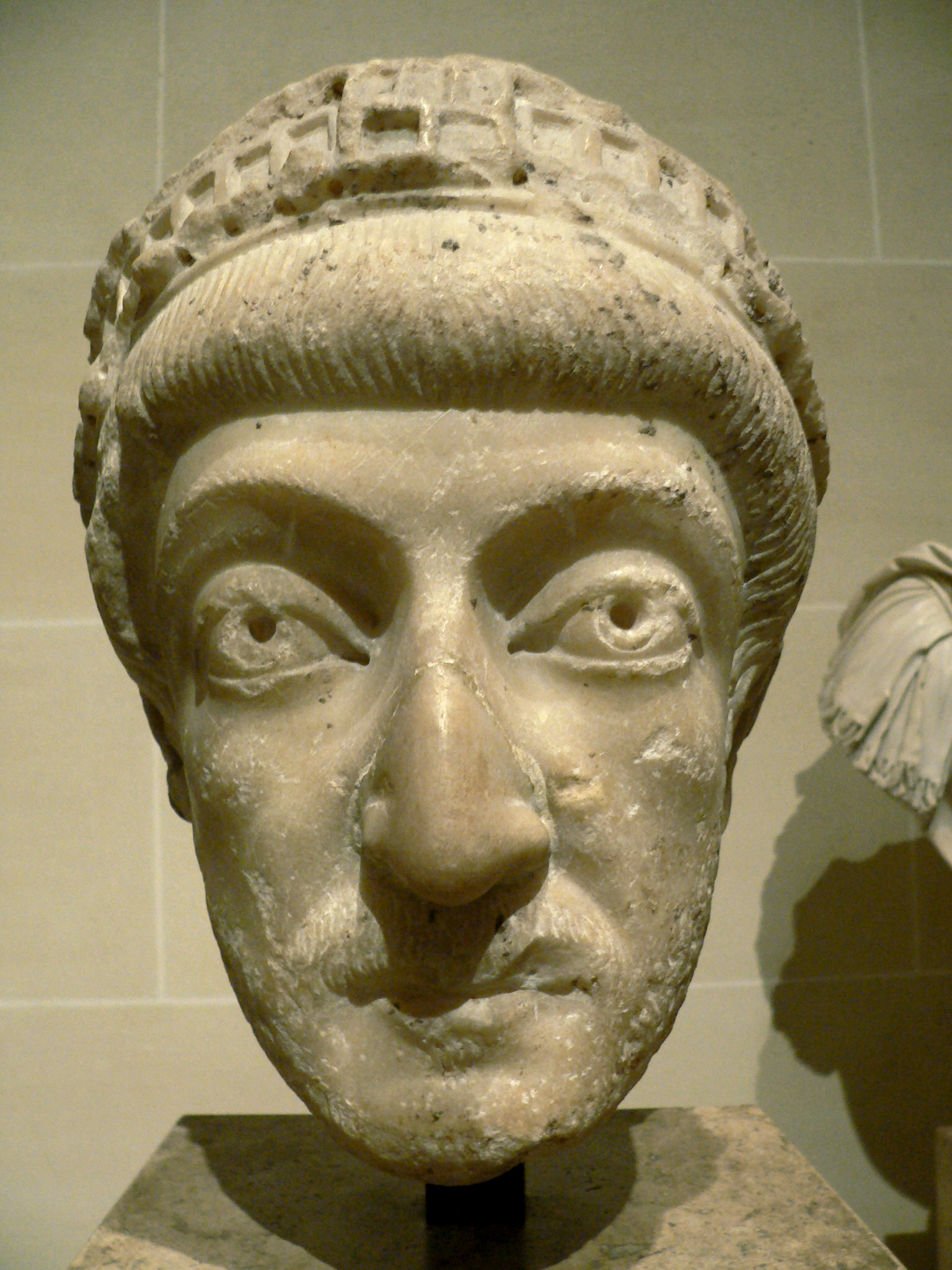
Bust of Eastern Roman Emperor Theodosius II (r. 408–450 AD); marble, 5th century AD

Bust of an Eastern Roman lady (Galla Placidia?) in the Musée Saint-Raymond de Toulouse, 5th century AD

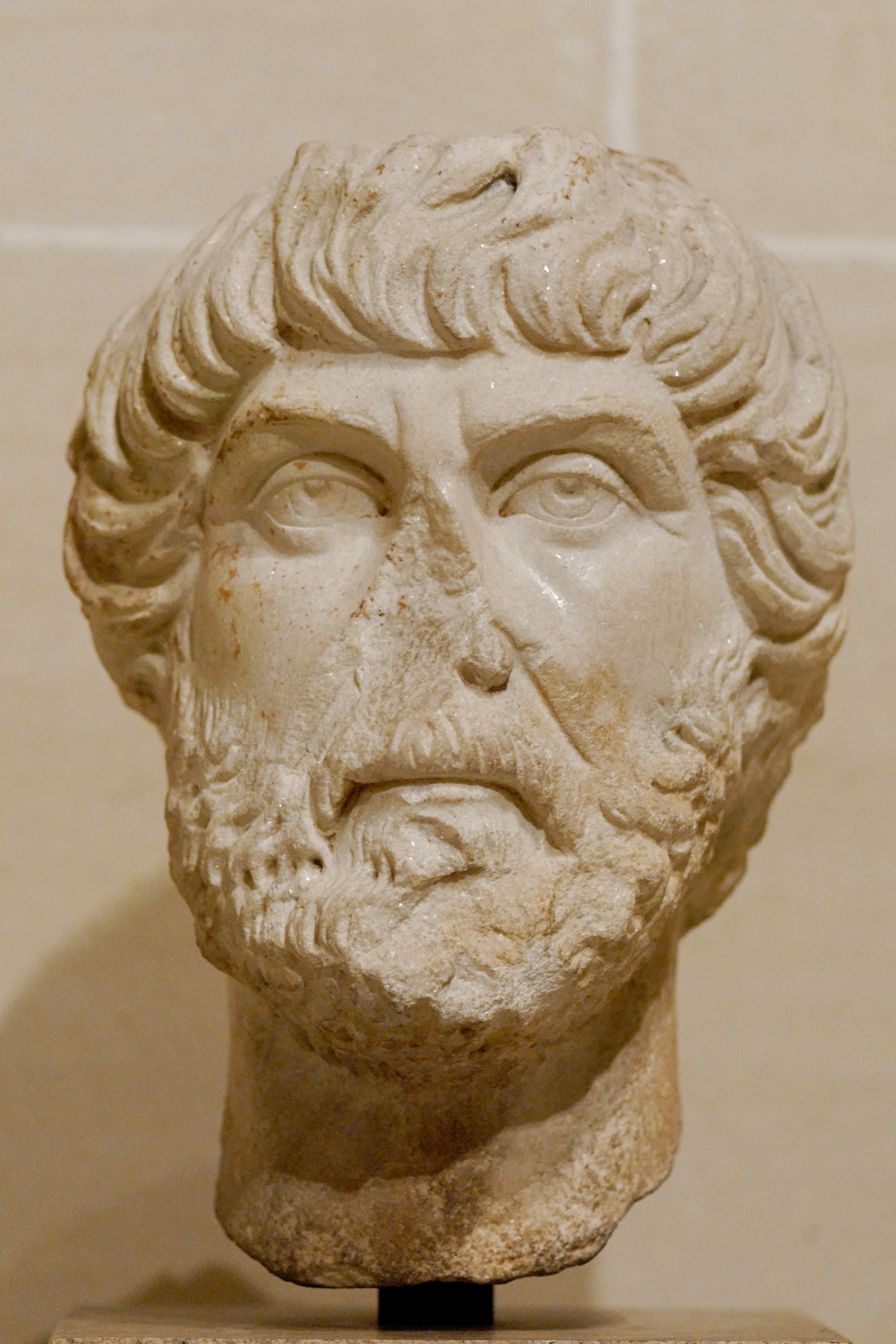
Bust of an unknown orator or philosopher from Tartus, now in the Louvre, 5th century AD

== Portraiture ==
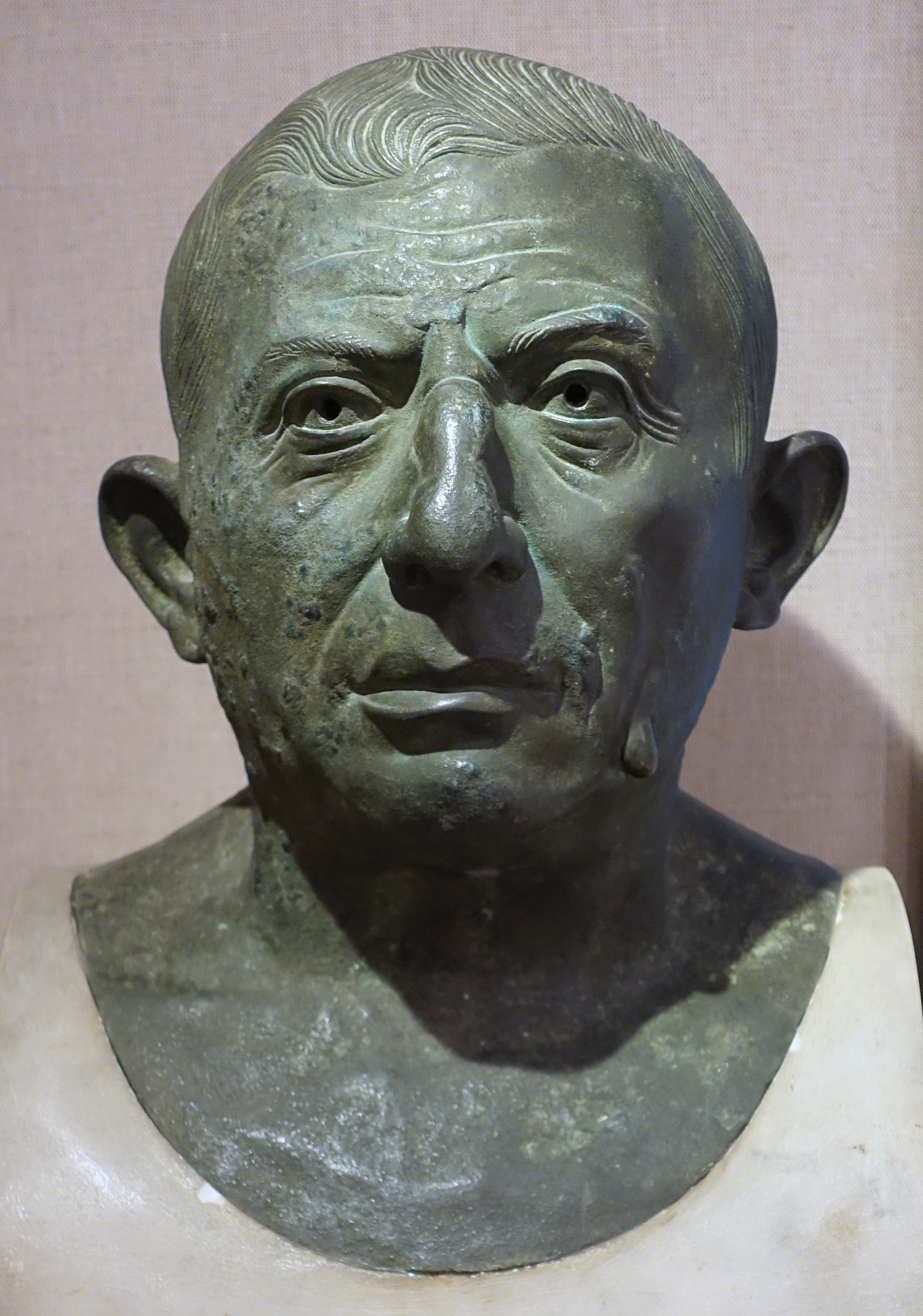
Roman portraiture is characterized by its "warts and all" realism; bust of Lucius Caecilius Iucundus, a cast of the original in bronze found in Pompeii, now in the Naples National Archaeological Museum

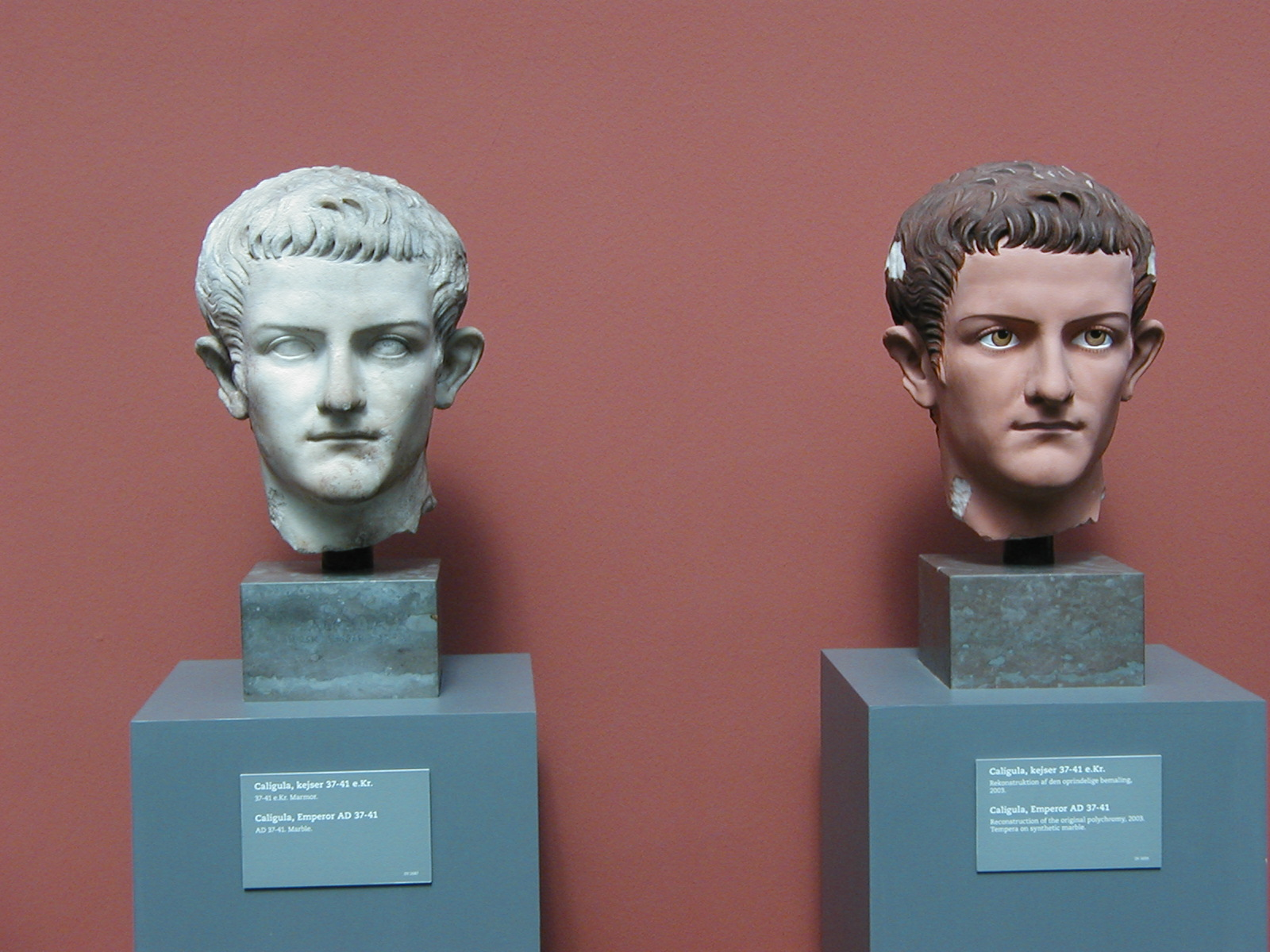
Marble bust of Caligula, Roman emperor AD 37–41, with traces of original paint beside a plaster replica trying to recreate the polychrome traditions of ancient sculpture. Exhibition in Ny Carlsberg Glyptotek in Copenhagen, Denmark.

Portraiture is a dominant genre of Roman sculpture, growing perhaps from the traditional Roman emphasis on family and ancestors; the entrance hall (atrium) of a Roman elite house displayed ancestral portrait busts. During the Roman Republic, it was considered a sign of character not to gloss over physical imperfections, and to depict men in particular as rugged and unconcerned with vanity: the portrait was a map of experience. During the Imperial era, more idealized statues of Roman emperors became ubiquitous, particularly in connection with the state religion of Rome. Tombstones of even the modestly rich middle class sometimes exhibit portraits of the otherwise unknown deceased carved in relief.

Among the many museums with examples of Roman portrait sculpture, the collections of the Metropolitan Museum of Art in New York and the British Museum in London are especially noteworthy.

== Religious and funerary art ==
Religious art was also a major form of Roman sculpture. A central feature of a Roman temple was the cult statue of the deity, who was regarded as "housed" there (see aedes). Although images of deities were also displayed in private gardens and parks, the most magnificent of the surviving statues appear to have been cult images. Roman altars were usually rather modest and plain, but some Imperial examples are modeled after Greek practice with elaborate reliefs, most famously the Ara Pacis, which has been called "the most representative work of Augustan art." Small bronze statuettes and ceramic figurines, executed with varying degrees of artistic competence, are plentiful in the archaeological record, particularly in the provinces, and indicate that these were a continual presence in the lives of Romans, whether for votives or for private devotional display at home or in neighborhood shrines. These typically show more regional variation in style than large and more official works, and also stylistic preferences between different classes.

Roman marble sarcophagi mostly date from the 2nd to the 4th century CE, after a change in Roman burial customs from cremation to inhumation, and were mostly made in a few major cities, including Rome and Athens, which exported them to other cities. Elsewhere the stela gravestone remained more common. They were always a very expensive form reserved for the elite, and especially so in the relatively few very elaborately carved examples; most were always relatively plain, with inscriptions, or symbols such as garlands. Sarcophagi divide into a number of styles, by the producing area. "Roman" ones were made to rest against a wall, and one side was left uncarved, while "Attic" and other types were carved on all four sides; but the short sides were generally less elaborately decorated in both types.

The time taken to make them encouraged the use of standard subjects, to which inscriptions might be added to personalize them, and portraits of the deceased were slow to appear. The sarcophagi offer examples of intricate reliefs that depict scenes often based on Greek and Roman mythology or mystery religions that offered personal salvation, and allegorical representations. Roman funerary art also offers a variety of scenes from everyday life, such as game-playing, hunting, and military endeavors.

Early Christian art quickly adopted the sarcophagus, and they are the most common form of early Christian sculpture, progressing from simple examples with symbols to elaborate fronts, often with small scenes of the Life of Christ in two rows within an architectural framework. The Sarcophagus of Junius Bassus (c. 359) is of this type, and the earlier Dogmatic Sarcophagus rather simpler. The huge porphyry Sarcophagi of Helena and Constantina are grand Imperial examples.

Scenes from Roman sarcophagi

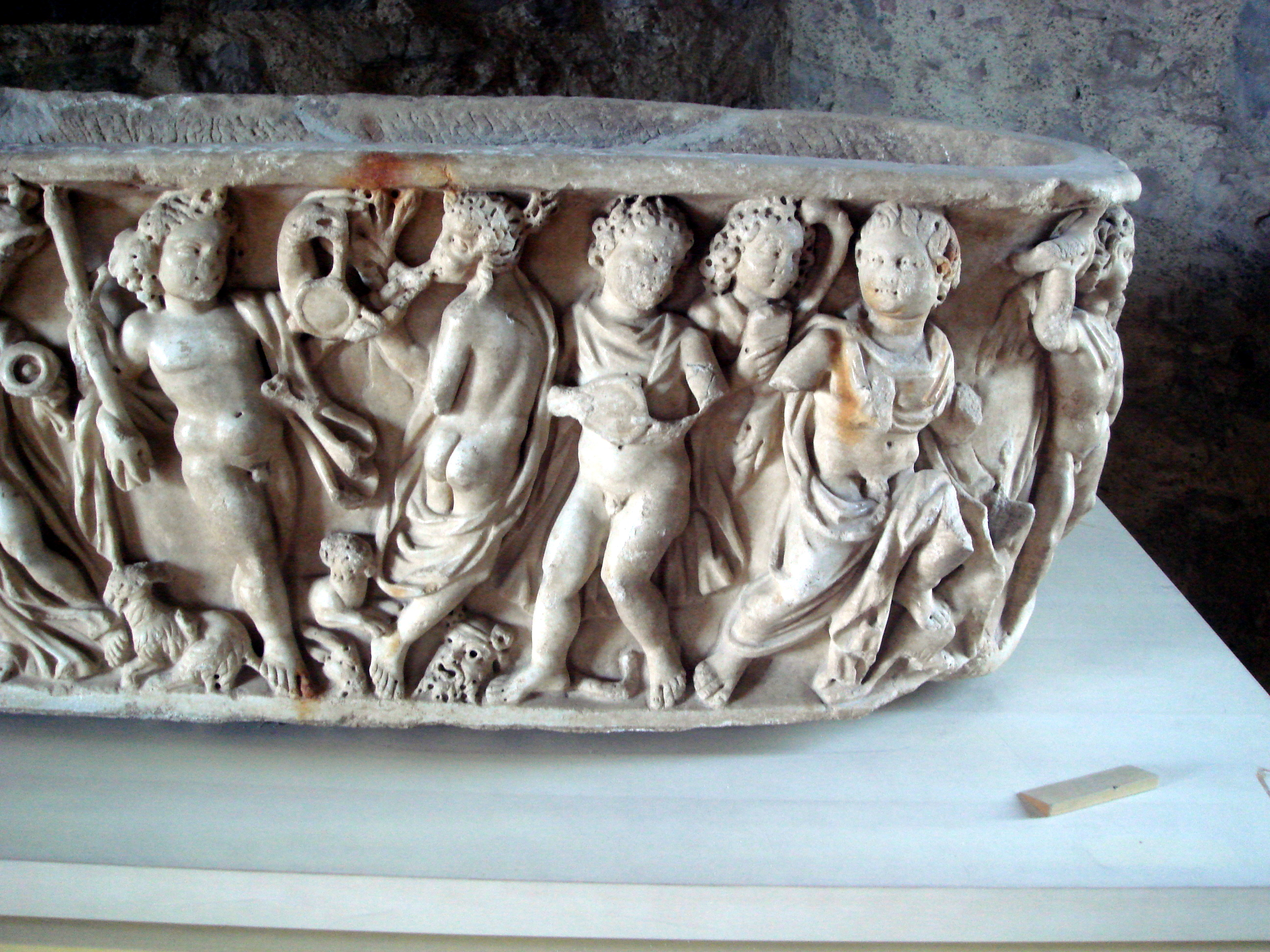
Scenes of Orphic religion (2nd century)

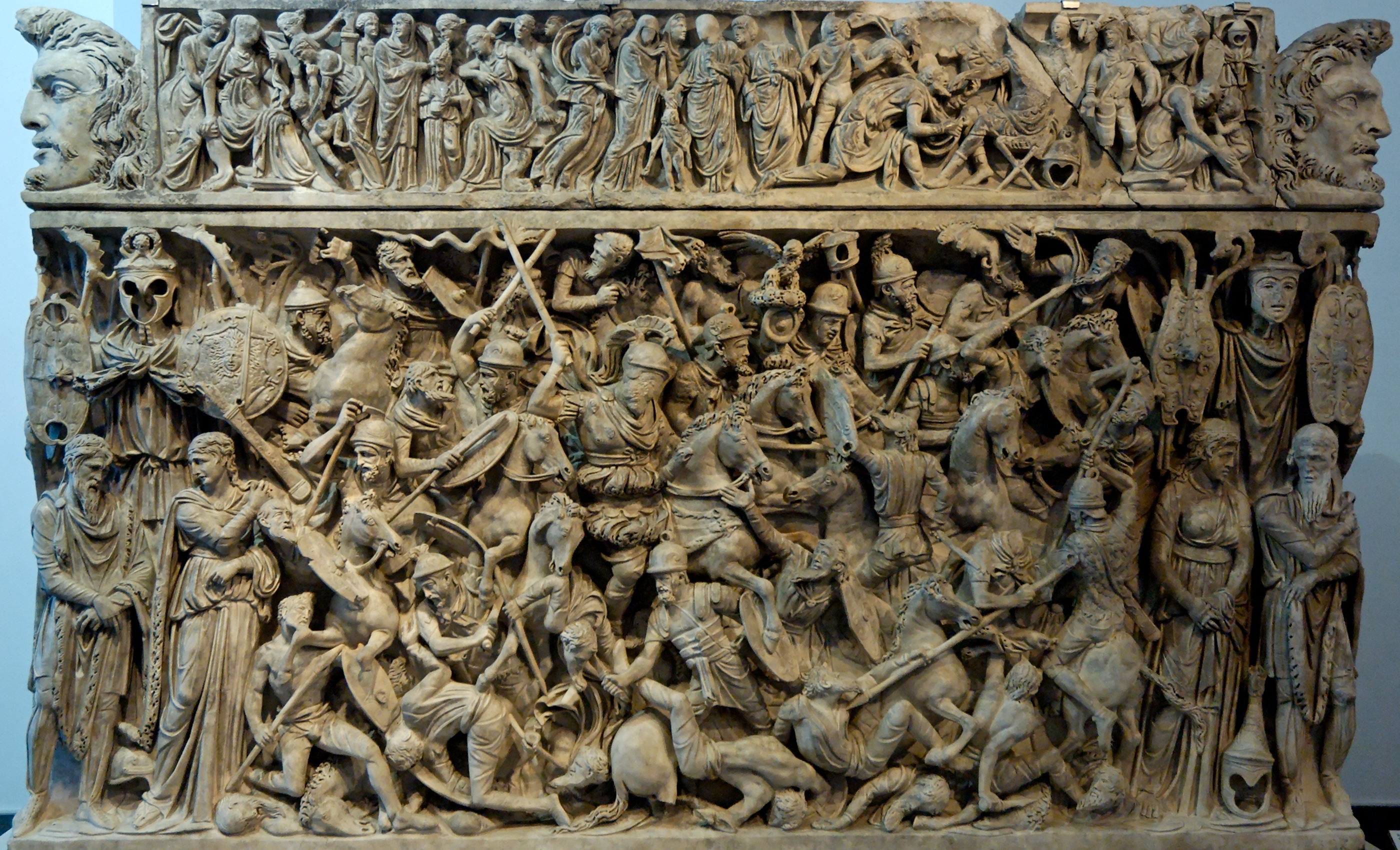
Portonaccio sarcophagus with a battle

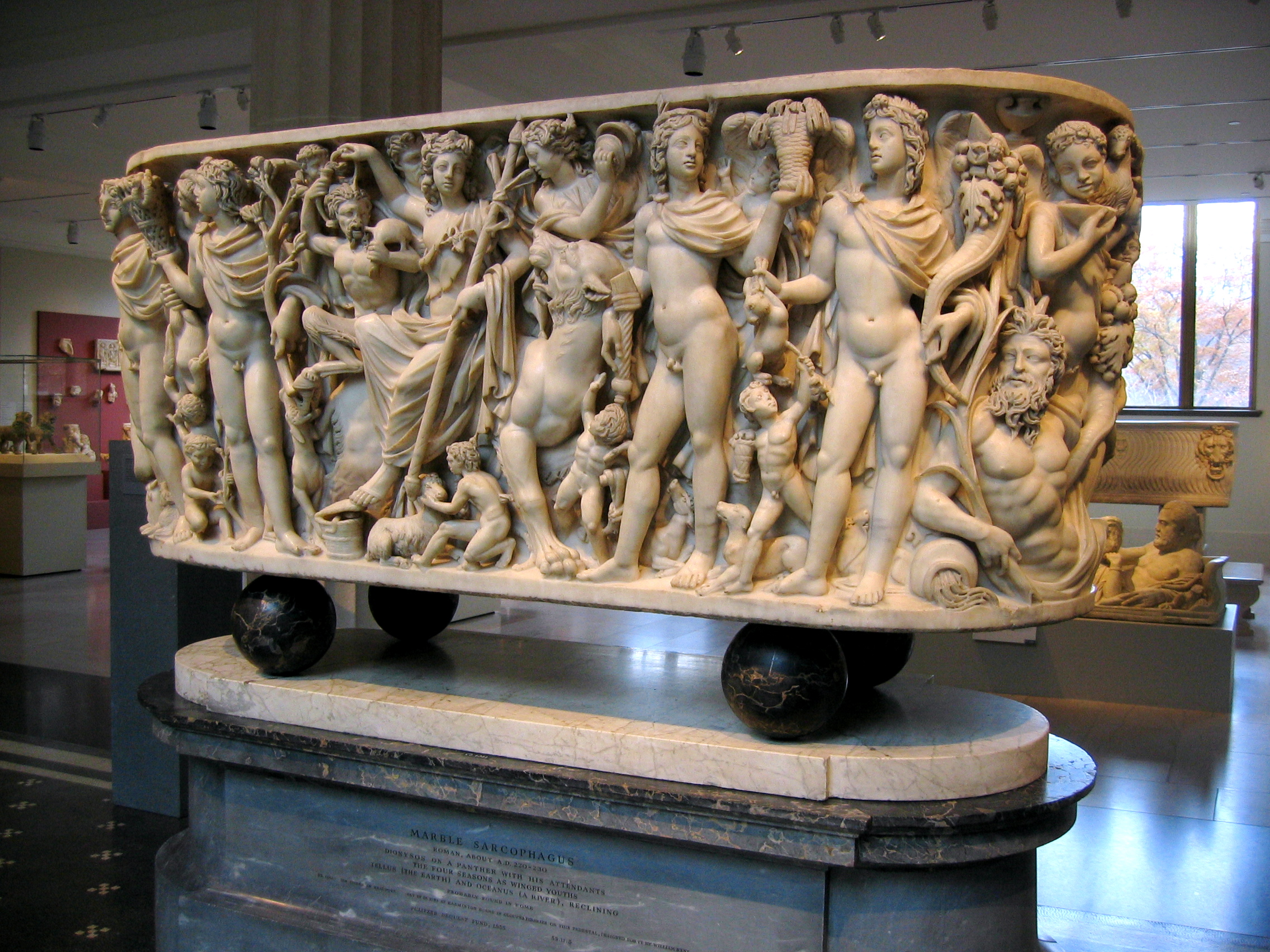
Dionysus riding a panther and accompanied by attendants, 220-230 AD

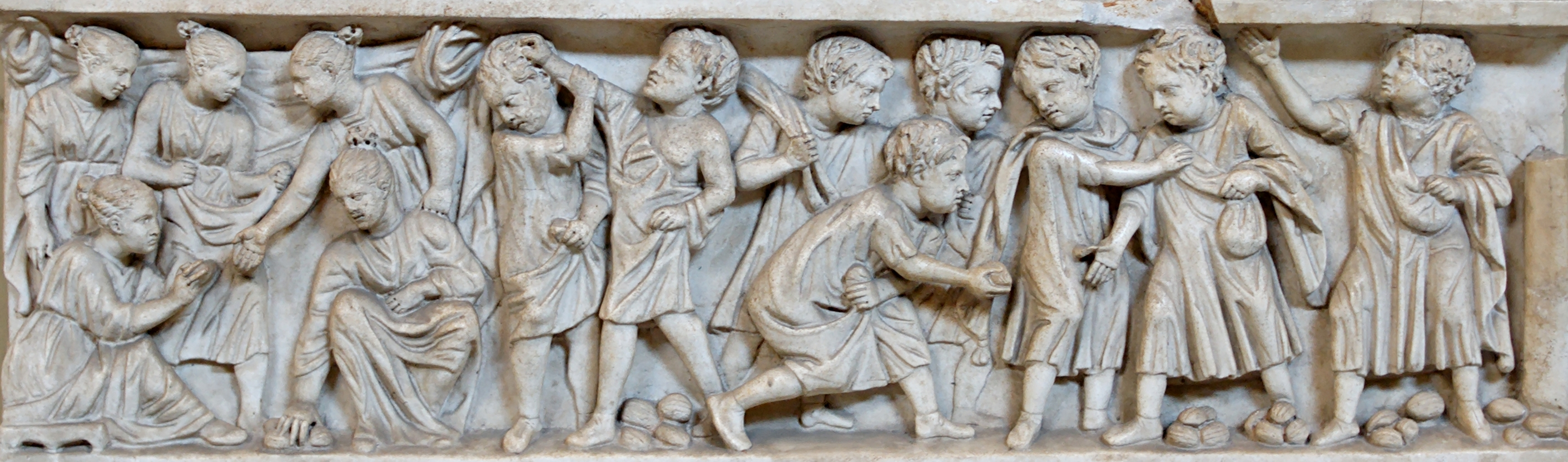
Children playing with nuts (3rd century)

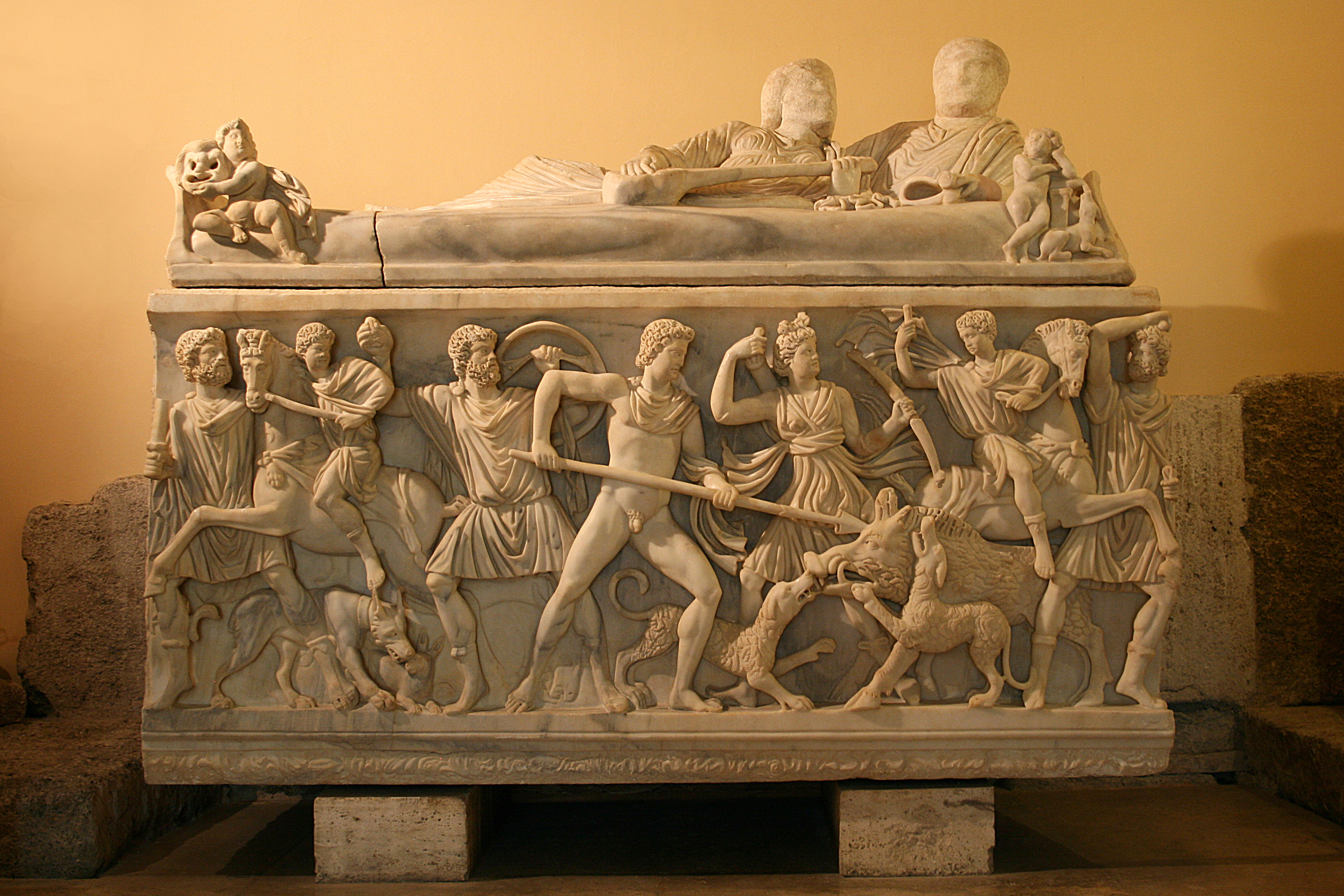
Sarcophagus with the Calydonian hunt, Palazzo dei Senatori - Musei Capitolini, Rome.

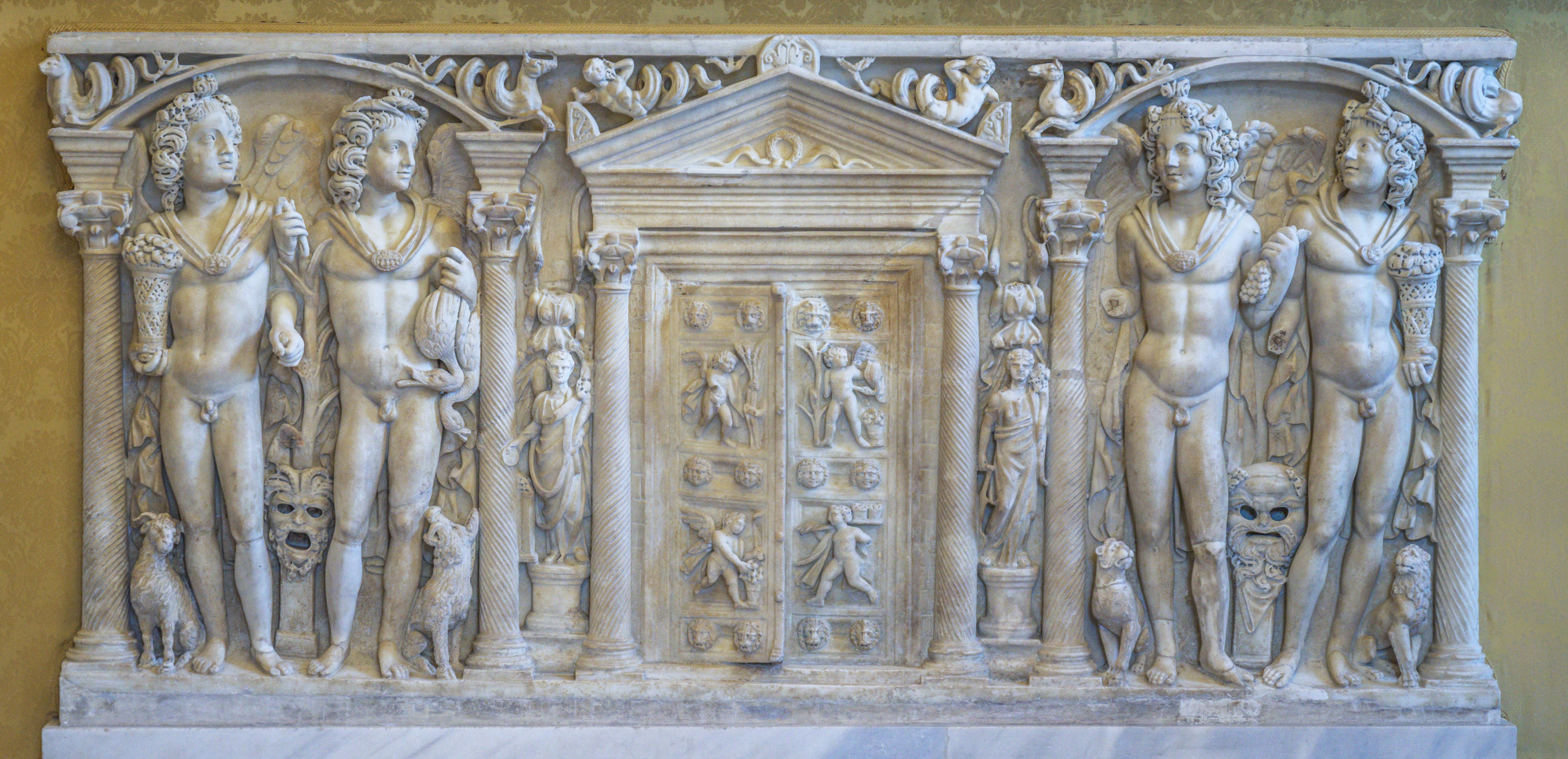
Sarcophagus with the Four Seasons allegory
(3rd century), Palazzo dei Senatori - Musei Capitolini, Rome.

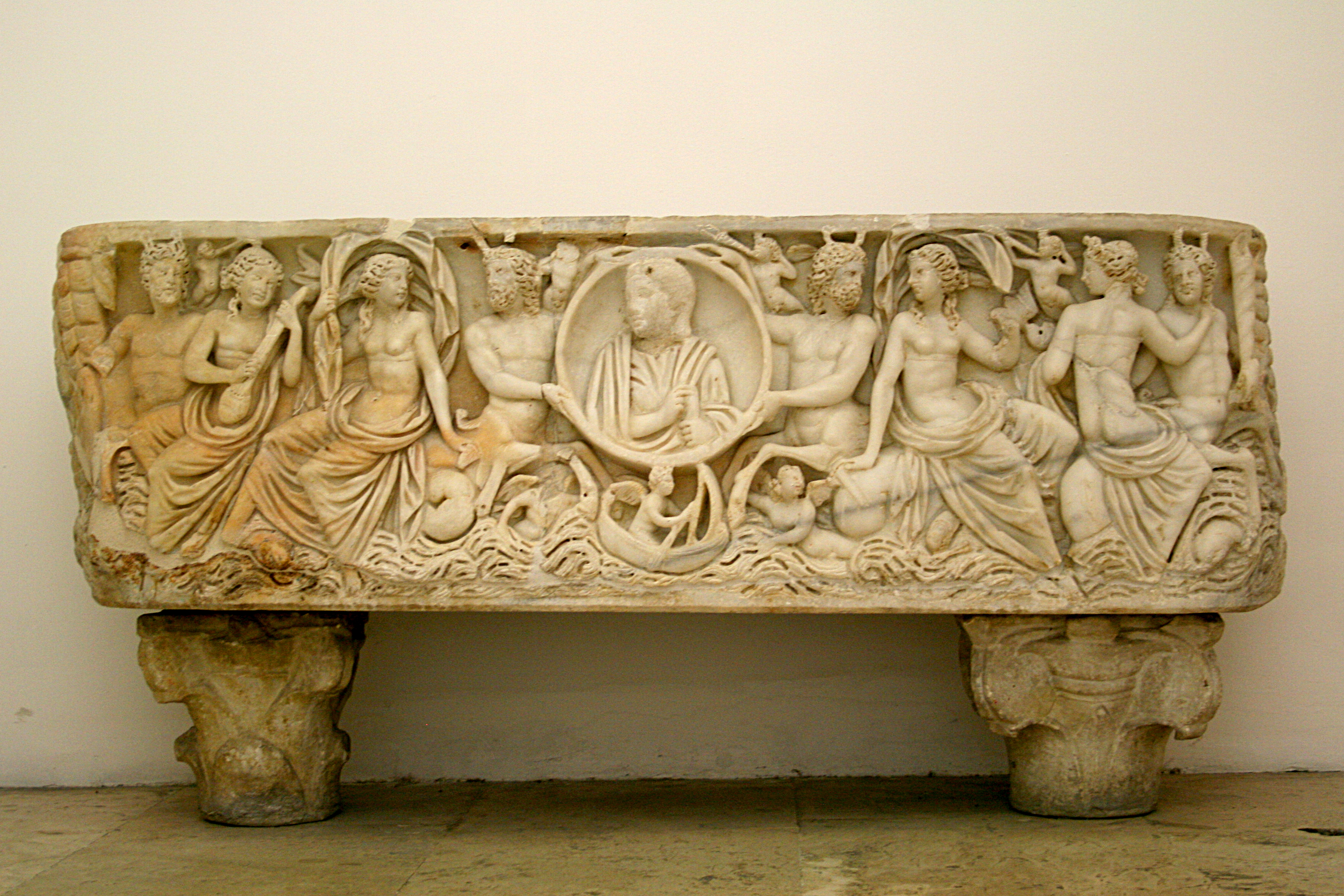
Sarcophagus of the Quinta Flavia Severina, Palazzo dei Senatori - Musei Capitolini, Rome.

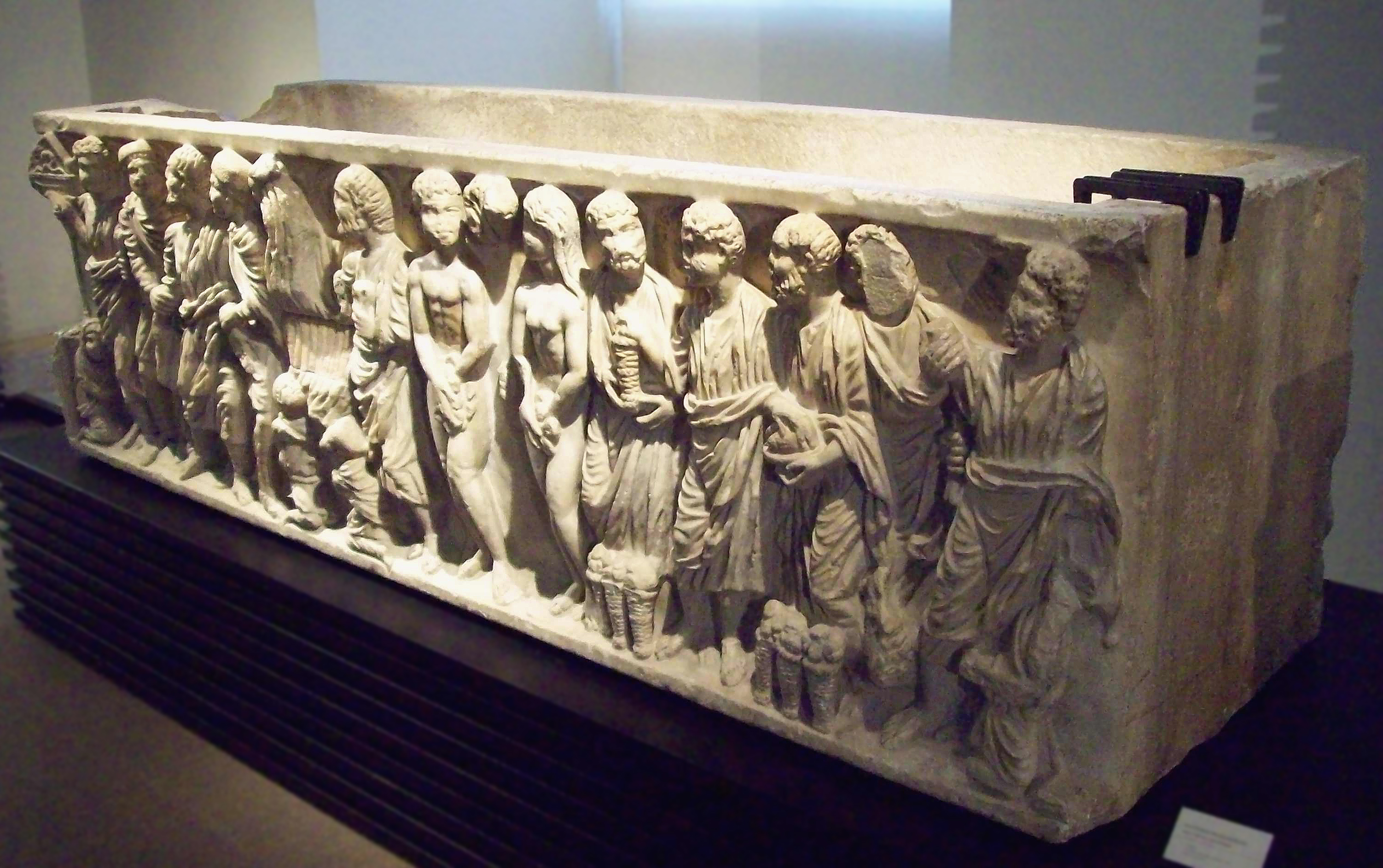
Early Christian marble sarcophagus with a high-relief representing scenes from the Old and the New Testament, c. 310 AD

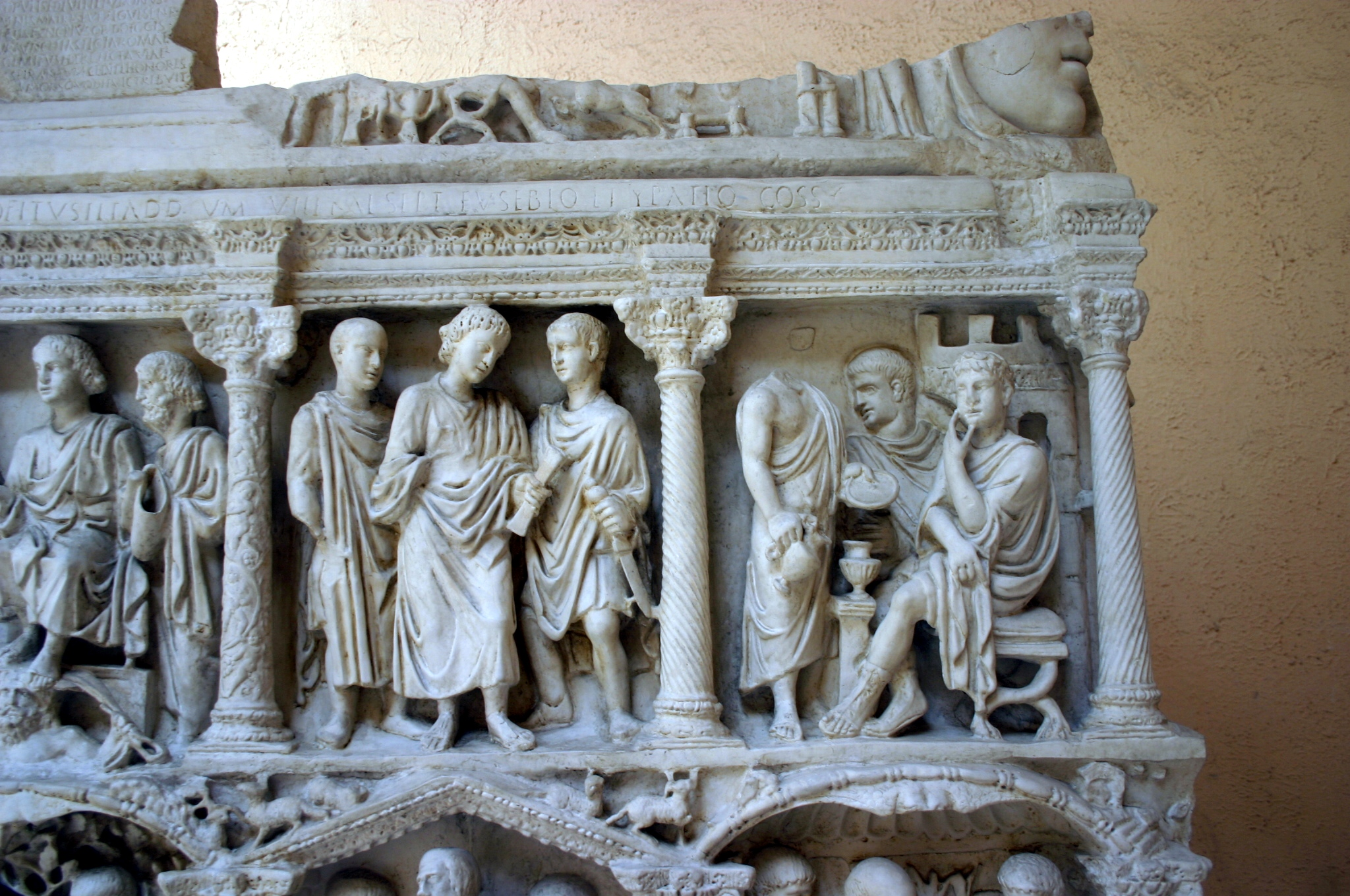
Cast of Christ's trial before Pilate, with Pilate about to wash his hands. Detail from the Early Christian Sarcophagus of Junius Bassus (d. 359)

== Gardens and baths ==
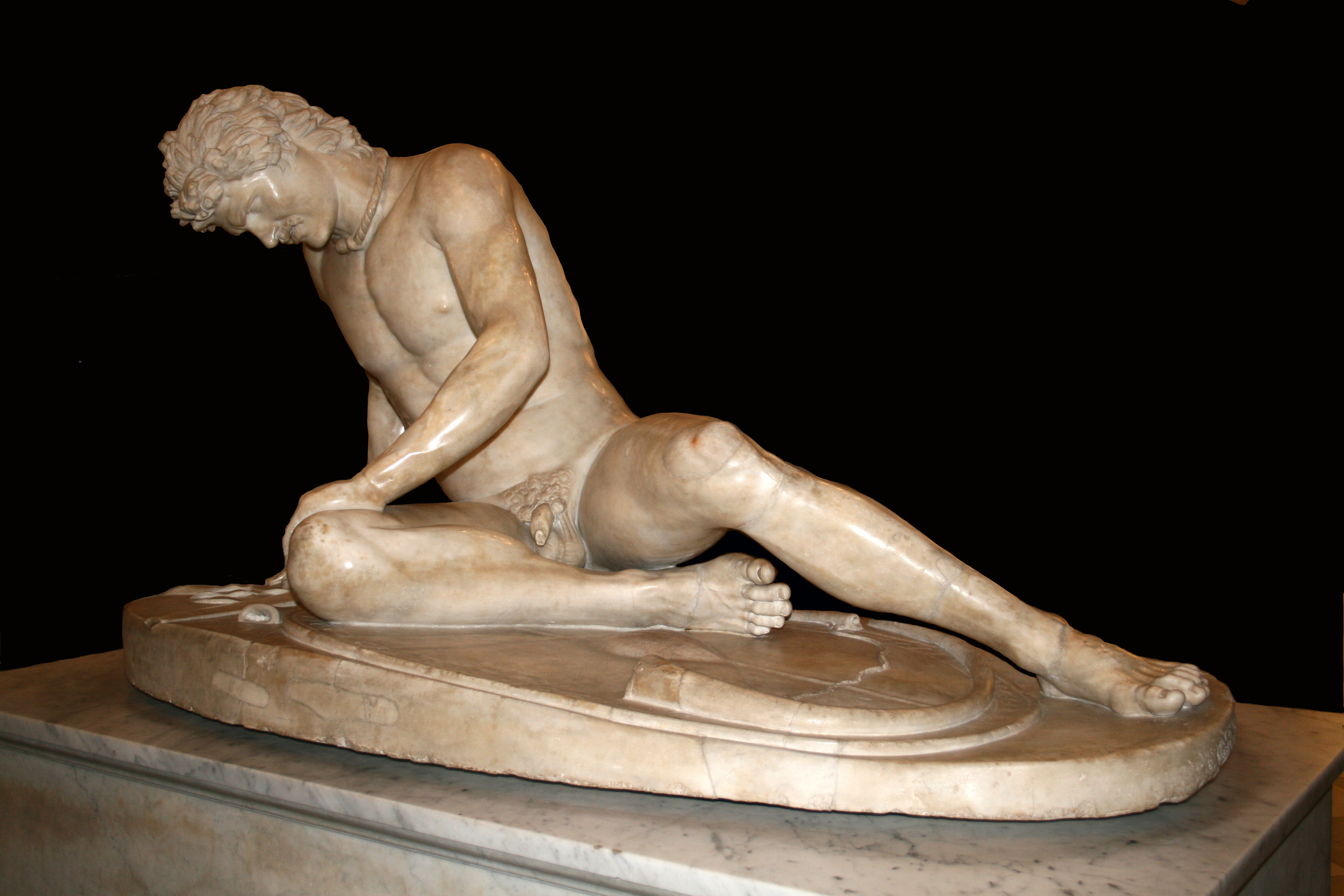
The Dying Gaul, Capitoline Museum, copy of Hellenistic original

A number of well-known large stone vases sculpted in relief from the Imperial period were apparently mostly used as garden ornaments; indeed many statues were also placed in gardens, both public and private. Sculptures recovered from the site of the Gardens of Sallust, opened to the public by Tiberius, include:

- the Obelisco Sallustiano, a Roman copy of an Egyptian obelisk which now stands in front of the Trinità dei Monti church above the Piazza di Spagna at the top of the Spanish Steps
- the Borghese Vase, discovered there in the 16th century.
- the sculptures known as the Dying Gaul and the Gaul Killing Himself and His Wife, marble copies of parts a famous Hellenistic group in bronze commissioned for Pergamon in about 228 BC.
- the Ludovisi Throne (probably an authentic Greek piece in the Severe style), found in 1887, and the Boston Throne, found in 1894.
- the Crouching Amazon, found in 1888 near the via Boncompagni, about twenty-five meters from the via Quintino Sella (Museo Conservatori).

Roman baths were another site for sculpture; among the well-known pieces recovered from the Baths of Caracalla are the Farnese Bull and Farnese Hercules and larger-than-life-sized early 3rd century patriotic figures somewhat reminiscent of Soviet Social Realist works (now in the Museo di Capodimonte, Naples).

Found in the Gardens of Sallust and the Gardens of Maecenas:

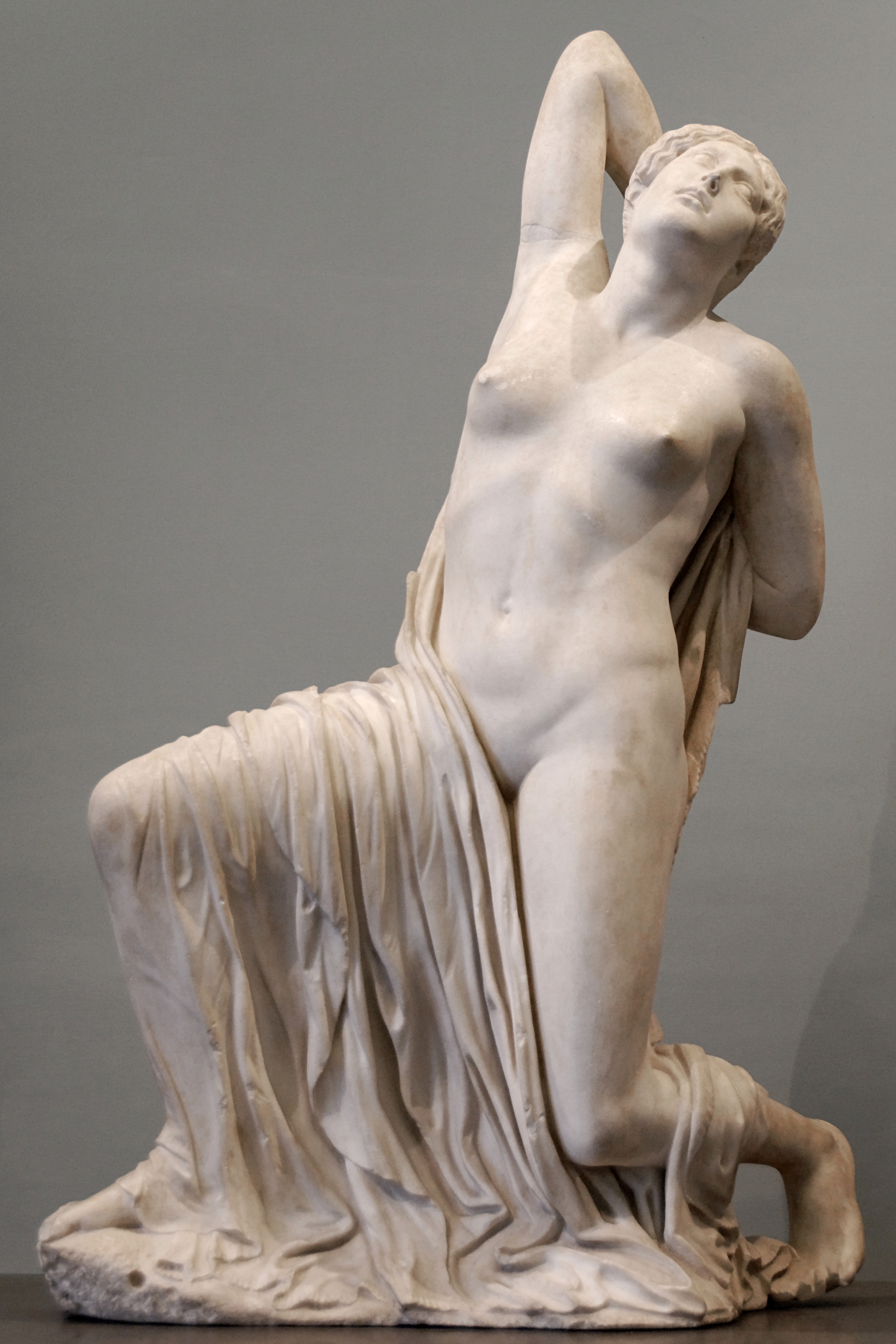
Falling Niobid, discovered in the site in 1906 (Museo Nazionale Romano), a Greek original

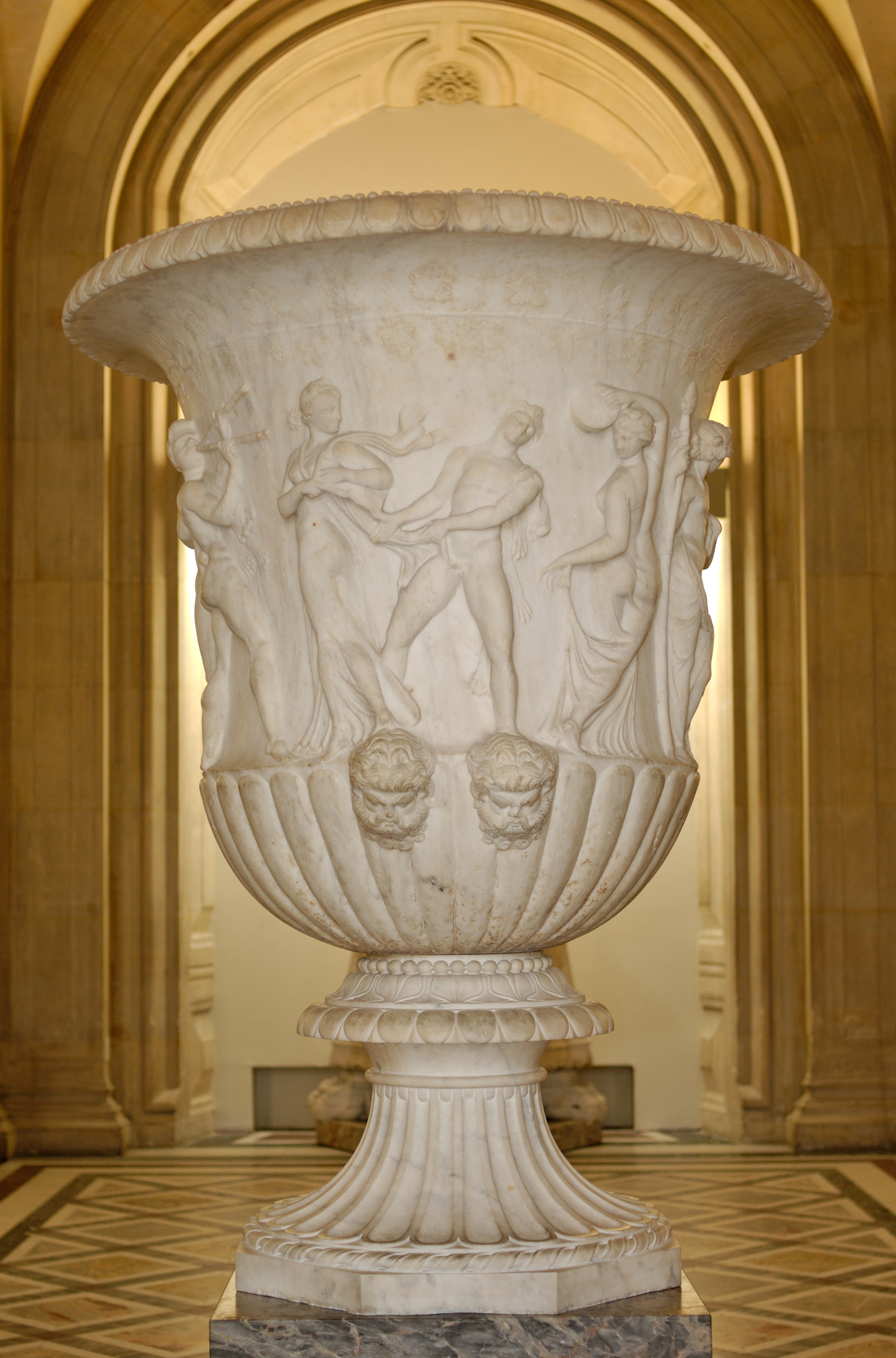
Borghese Vase

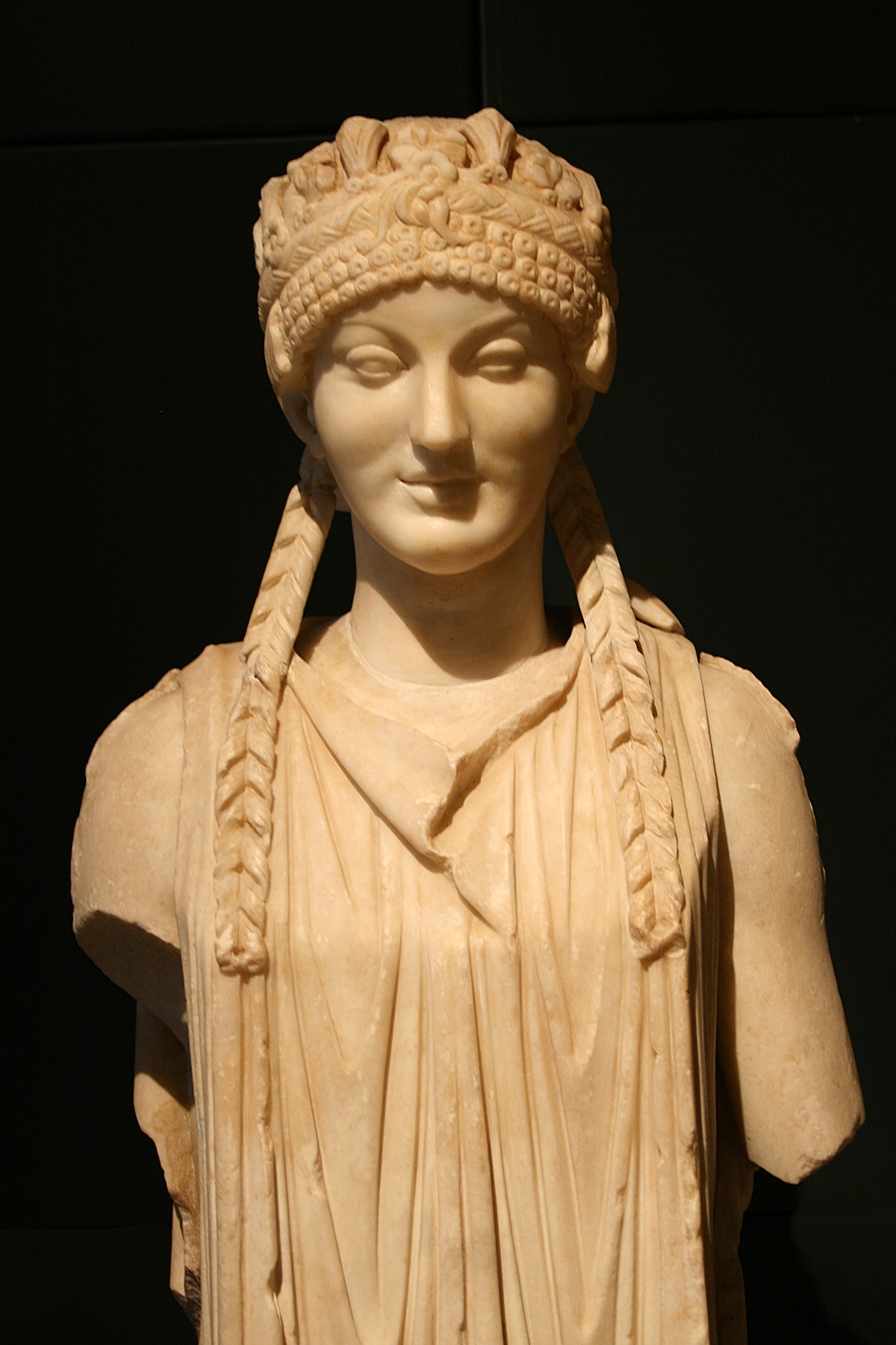
Caryatid statue, Palazzo dei Senatori - Musei Capitolini, Rome.

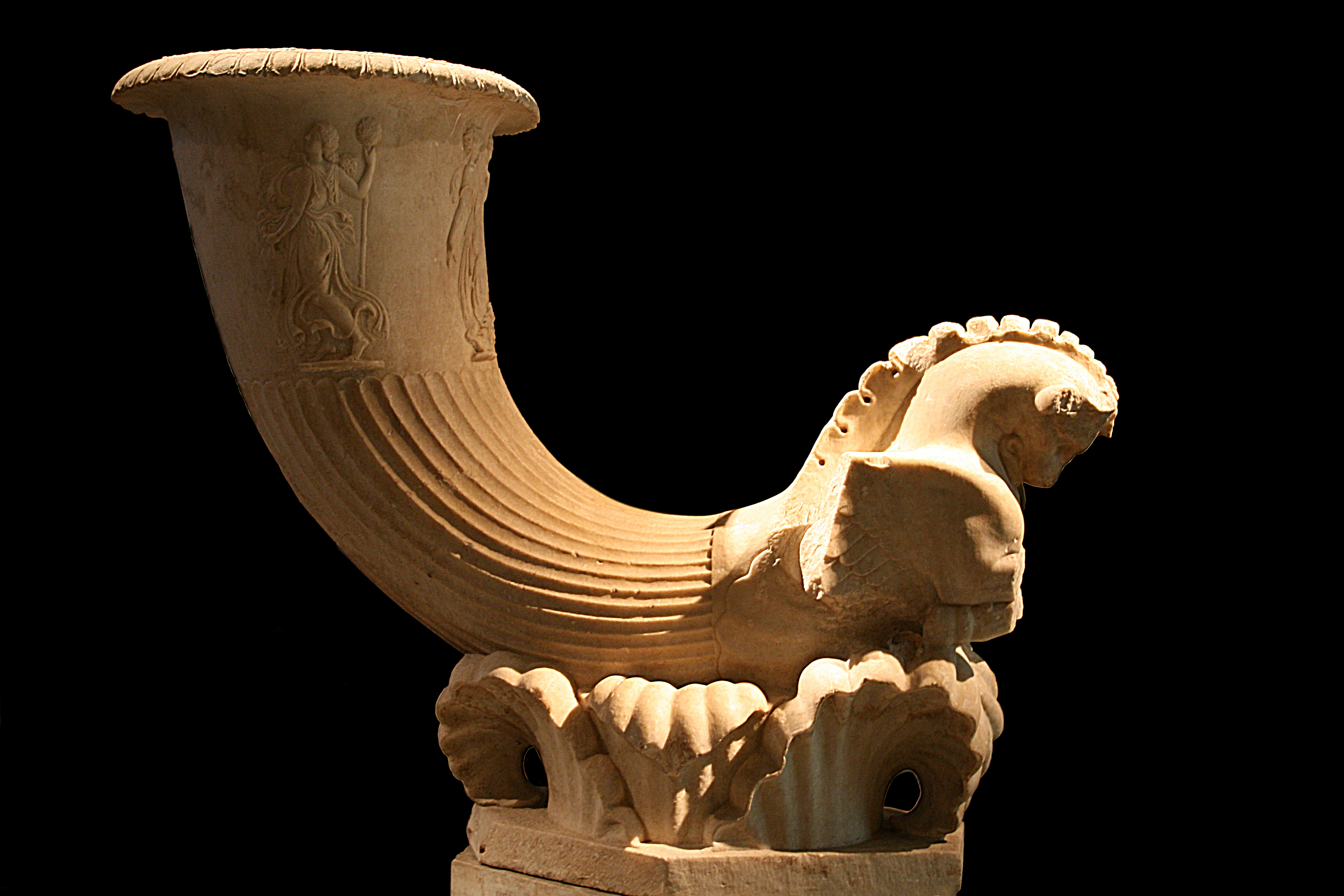
Fountain in the form of a horn-shaped drinking cup (rhyton), Palazzo dei Senatori - Musei Capitolini, Rome.

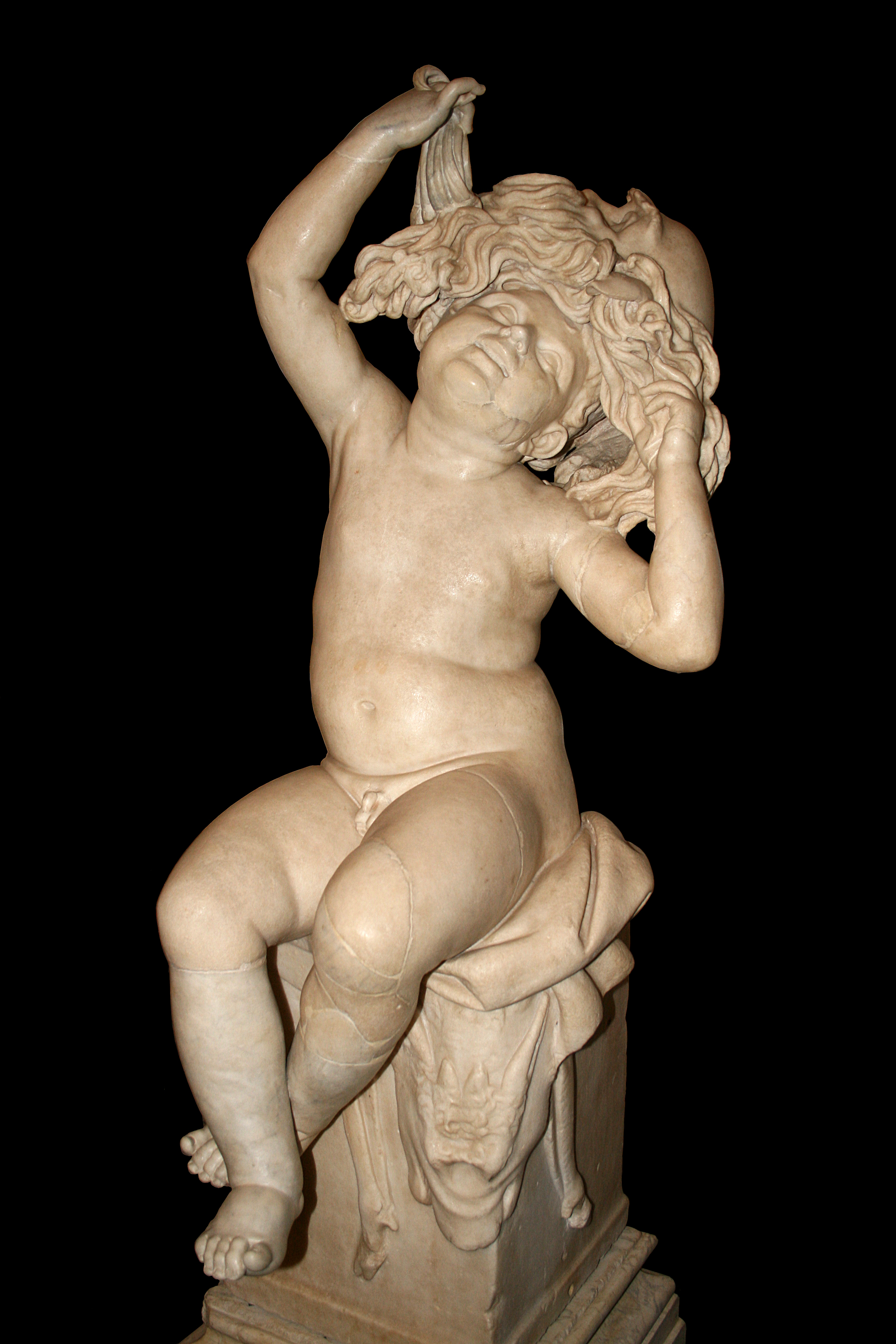
Child with a theatre mask, for a garden or house, Palazzo Nuovo - Musei Capitolini, Rome.

== Technology ==
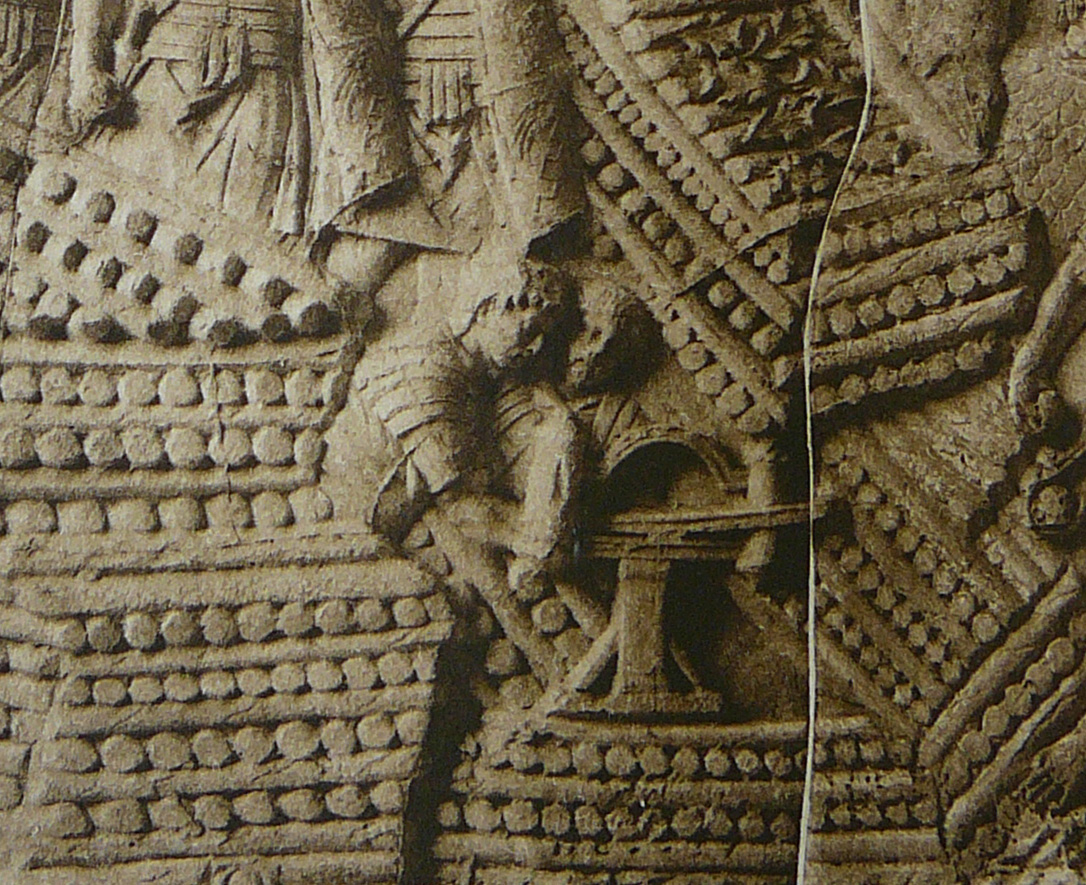
Detail from Trajan's Column with ballista

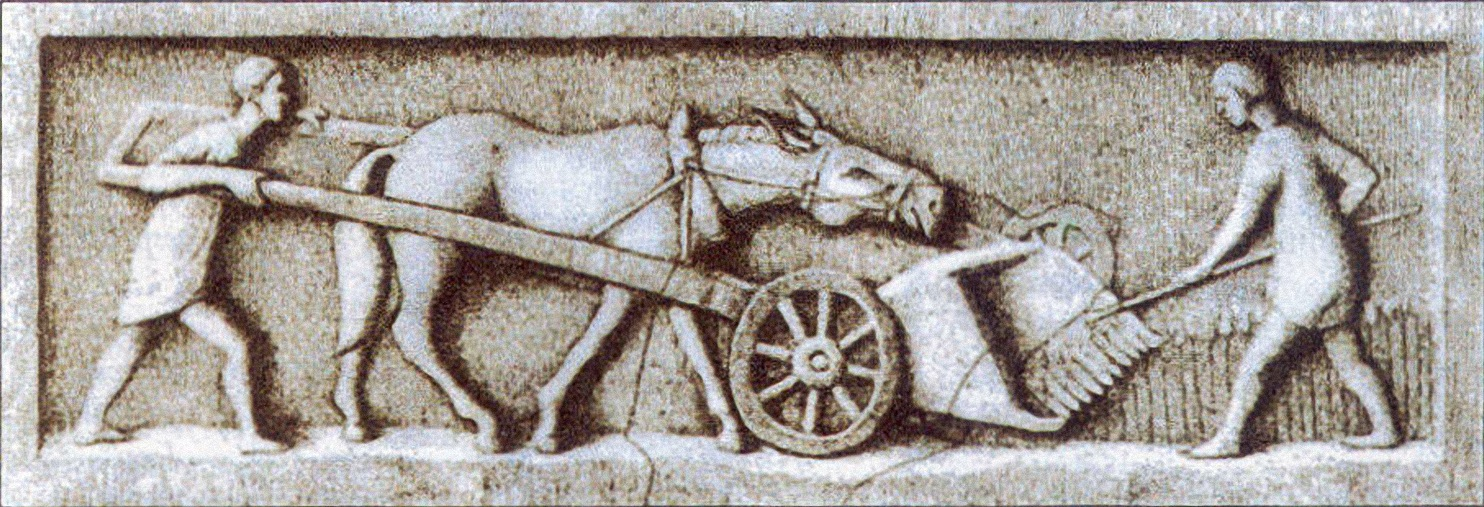
Roman harvesting machine from Trier (Germany), a city of the Roman province Gallia Belgica

Scenes shown on reliefs such as that of Trajan's Column and those shown on sarcophogi reveal images of Roman technology now long lost, such as ballistae and the use of waterwheel-driven saws for cutting stone. The latter was only recently discovered at Hieropolis and commemorates the miller who used the machine. Other reliefs show harvesting machines, much as they were described by Pliny the Elder in his Naturalis Historia.

== Architecture ==
Compared to the Greeks, the Romans made less use of stone sculpture on buildings, apparently having few friezes with figures. Important pediments, such as the Pantheon for example, originally had sculpture, but hardly any have survived. Terracotta relief panels called Campana reliefs have survived in good numbers. These were used to decorate interior walls, in strips.

The architectural writer Vitruvius is oddly reticent on the architectural use of sculpture, mentioning only a few examples, though he says that an architect should be able to explain the meaning of architectural ornament and gives as an example the use of caryatids.

== See also ==
- Ancient Roman pottery
- Classical sculpture
- Gallo-Roman art
- History of sculpture
- Roman art
- Roman engineering
- Roman technology
