= Junius Bassus =

Junius Bassus may refer to:

- Junius Bassus (consul), prefect from 318-331
- Junius Bassus Theotecnius (317-359), son of the consul

== See also ==
- Basilica of Junius Bassus
- Sarcophagus of Junius Bassus
