= List of Roman basilicas =

A basilica in ancient Rome was a large public building where business or legal matters could be transacted.

== Origins ==
In ancient Italy, basilicas began as large, covered buildings near city centers, adjacent to the forum, often at the opposite end from a temple. The building's form gradually came to be rectangular, covered with a post-and-lintel roof over an open hall flanked by columns and aisles extending from one end to the other, with entrances on the long sides, one of which would often be the side facing the forum. As such buildings came be used for judicial purposes, a semicircular apse would be built at one end, to give a place for the magistrate.

Traditional civic basilicas and bouleuteria declined in use with the weakening of the curial class (Latin: curiales) in the 4th and 5th centuries, while their structures were well suited to the requirements of congregational religious liturgies. The conversion of these types of buildings into Christian basilicas was also of symbolic significance, asserting the dominance of Christianity and supplanting the old political function of public space and the city-centre with an emphatically Christian social statement.

== Basilicas ==
- Basilica Porcia

Built in 184 BC by Cato the Elder, during his censorship, its remains were found in the north corner of the Roman Forum, between the Curia and the Atrium Libertatis (the headquarters of the censors). The remains show signs of reconstruction dating back to the age of Sulla. The basilica became the centre of intense economic activity and its architectural form recalled the "Egyptian Hall".

- Basilica Sempronia

Built on the northeastern side of the Roman Forum, behind the tabernae veteres by censor Tiberius Sempronius Gracchus in 170 BC.

- Basilica Opimia

Founded in 121 BC on the north corner of the Roman Forum by consul Lucius Opimius, who also financed the reconstruction of the adjoining Temple of Concord. It was probably destroyed during the renovation of the temple under Tiberius.

- Basilica Fulvia

Also known as Fulvia–Aemilia, it was built on the northeast side of the Roman Forum, behind the tabernae novae argentariae, by the censors in the year 179 BC, probably replacing a former basilica cited by Plautus. It was replaced in mid-1st century BC by the Basilica Aemilia.

- Basilica Aemilia

Basilica Aemilia, or Basilica Paulli, was situated on the northeastern side of the Roman Forum. It replaced the Basilica Fulvia or Fulvia–Aemilia behind the tabernae novae argentariae between 55 and 34 BC. It underwent various restorations until the 5th century.

- Basilica Julia

Built on the southwestern side of the Roman Forum, starting in 55 BC, it replaced the Basilica Sempronia and the tabernae veteres. It was inaugurated in 46 BC, but was damaged by fire in 12 BC. Having been restored and dedicated to the grandchildren of Augustus, Gaius and Lucius Caesar in 12 AD (Basilica Gai et Luci), it was destroyed by fire in 283, and once again restored by Diocletian.

- Basilica Argentaria

Mentioned in late sources, it has been identified by the two-aisled portico on pillars located on the left side of the Temple of Venus Genetrix in the Forum of Caesar and was pertinent to the renovation of the complex under Trajan.

- Basilica Ulpia

This basilica closed Trajan's Forum on its northwestern side.

- Basilica of Maxentius

Also known as the Basilica Constantini or Basilica Nova, its construction began under Maxentius around 305 AD on the slopes of the Velian Hill towards the Roman Forum and ended under Consantine I. Probably in the 4th century, it was integrated with a porticoed entrance towards the Via Sacra and an apse in the central niche of the opposite wall.

== Private basilicas ==
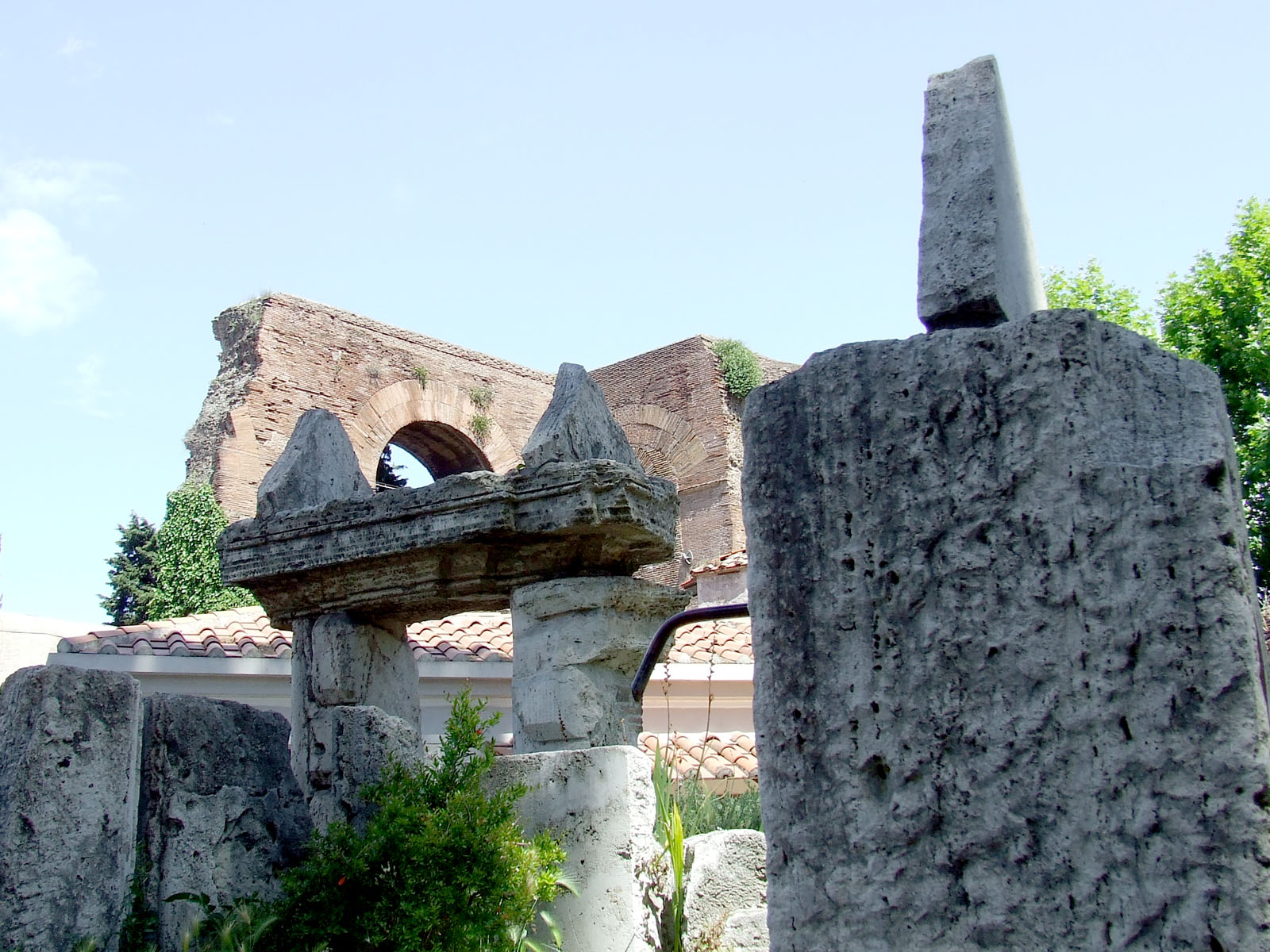
Villa Celimontana, remains of the Basilica Hilariana: detail of a dolmen and a sacral memorial stone. In the background, the Arcus Neroniani.

- Basilica of Junius Bassus (Basilica Iunii Bassi)

Built by Junius Bassus, consul in 331 AD, it is located on the Esquiline Hill and consists of a room richly decorated with opus sectile. It was converted into a church by Pope Simplicius (468-483).

- Basilica Hilariana

This is a small basilica on the Caelian Hill, it is now situated under a modern military hospital. It was built in the mid-2nd century at the behest of the margaritarius (pearl merchant) Manius Publicius Ilarius and was intended for the college of the dendrophores, a religious congregation linked to the cult of Magna Mater and Attis, in which Ilarius had the role of quinquennalis perpetuus. The complex, modified in the 3rd century, was abandoned in the 7th, maybe following an earthquake in 618 AD. It was partially underground: twelve steps outlined with marble led to a vestibule with black and white mosaics, depicting an eye struck by a spear with a ring of birds and animals around it; a threshold depicting the footprint of two feet, one entering and one leaving, led to a room with a basin and the base of a statue dedicated to Ilarius.

== Mentioned in sources ==
- Basilica Antonarum Duarum

Remembered in a burial inscription, it was probably a building dedicated by Antonia major and Antonia minor, the two daughters of Octavia, sister of Augustus, and by Mark Antony. A possible location has been proposed in the Forum of Augustus.

- Basilica Iulia Aquiliana

It is remembered by Vitruvius as a long and narrow building, with vestibules (chalcidica) on the short sides. Its location is unknown: it could have been the name of the Basilica Julia at the time of Caesar.

- Basilica Marciana and Basilica Matidiae

It is probably identifiable with the arcades that flanked the temple dedicated to Matidia in the Campus Martius.

- Basilica of Neptune

It is identified with the brick hall whose remains are preserved behind the Pantheon, dating back to the era of Hadrian. The hall, connected to the Baths of Agrippa, had a cross vaulted roof; and the walls were articulated by columns with a frieze depicting dolphins, with a rich marble covering. It was supposedly used for business negotiations.
