= Early Christian art and architecture =

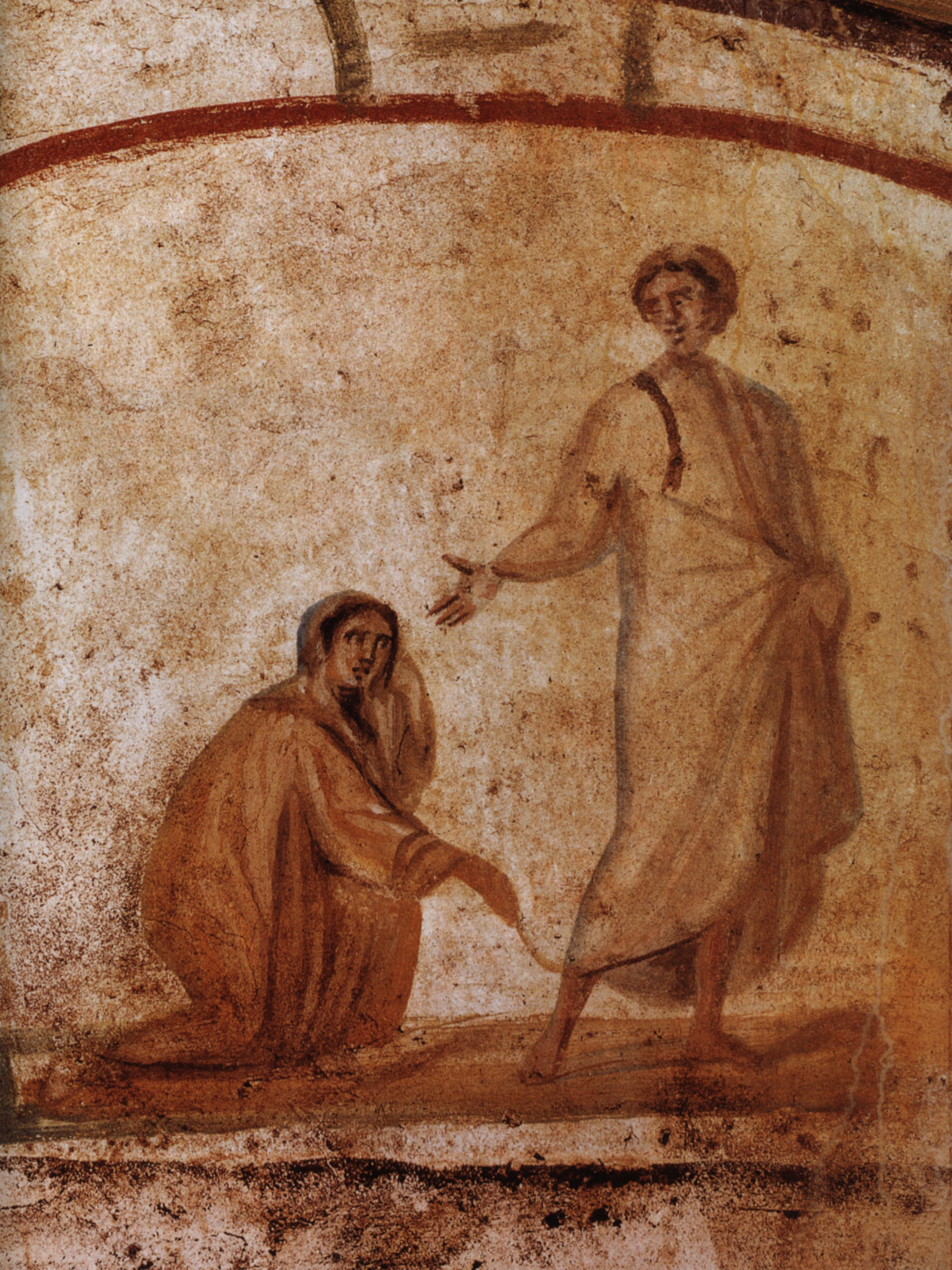
Jesus healing the bleeding woman, Roman catacombs, 300–350

Early Christian art and architecture (or Paleochristian art) is the art produced by Christians, or under Christian patronage, from the earliest period of Christianity to, depending on the definition, sometime between 260 and 525. In practice, identifiably Christian art only survives from the 2nd century onwards. After 550, Christian art is classified as Byzantine, or according to region.

It is hard to know when distinctly Christian art began. Prior to 100, Christians may have been constrained by their position as a persecuted group from producing durable works of art. Since Christianity as a religion was not well represented in the public sphere, the lack of surviving art may reflect a lack of funds for patronage, and simply small numbers of followers. The Old Testament restrictions against the production of graven (an idol or fetish carved in wood or stone) images (see also Idolatry and Christianity) may also have constrained Christians from producing art. Christians may have made or purchased art with pagan iconography, but given it Christian meanings, as they later did. If this happened, "Christian" art would not be immediately recognizable as such.

Early Christianity used the same artistic media as the surrounding pagan culture. These media included fresco, mosaics, sculpture, and manuscript illumination. Early Christian art used not only Roman forms but also Roman styles. Late classical style included a proportional portrayal of the human body and impressionistic presentation of space. Late classical style is seen in early Christian frescos, such as those in the Catacombs of Rome, which include most examples of the earliest Christian art.

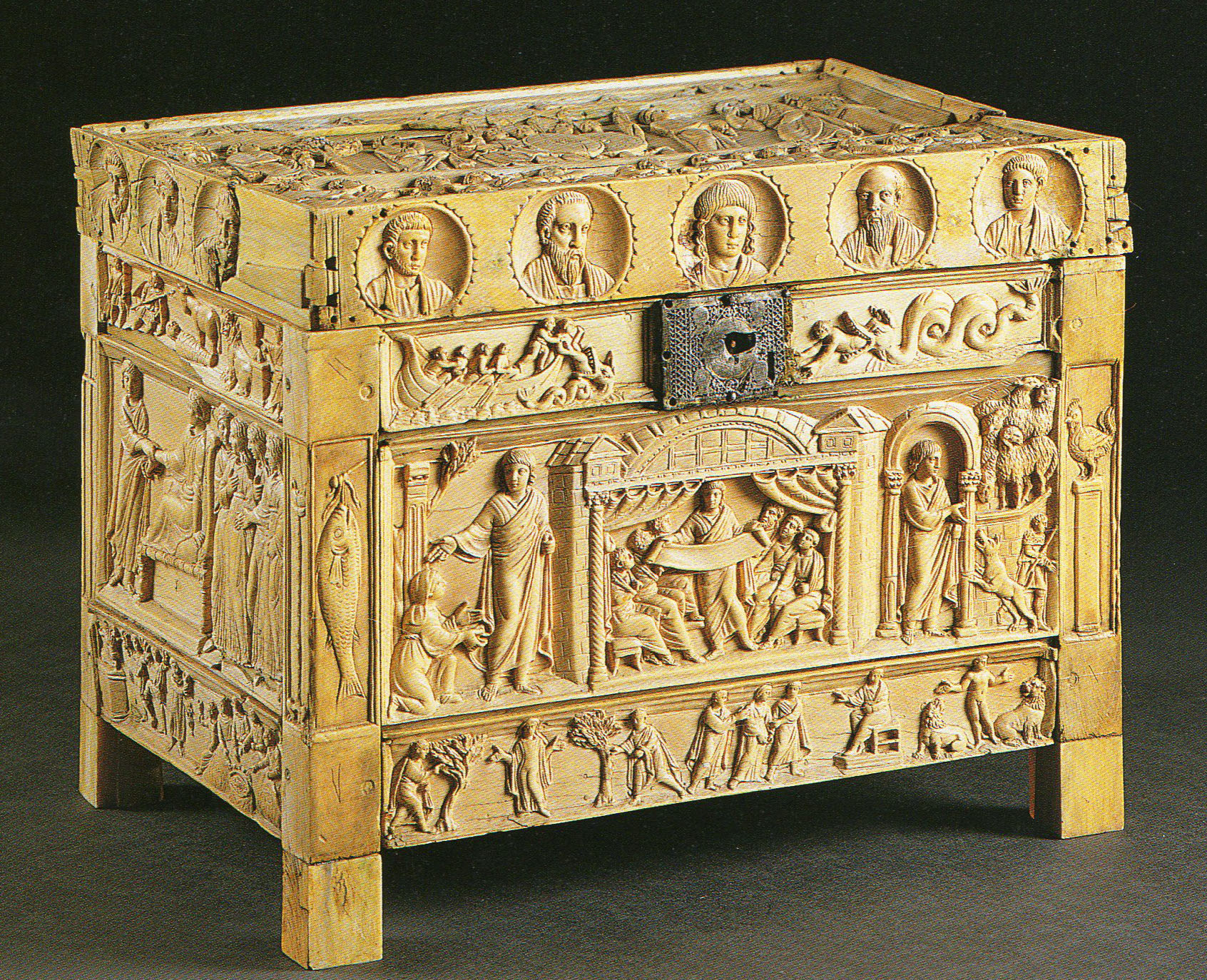
The Brescia Casket, 4th-century ivory

Early Christian art and architecture adapted Roman artistic motifs and gave new meanings to what had been pagan symbols. Among the motifs adopted were the peacock, Vitis viniferavines, and the "Good Shepherd". Early Christians also developed their own iconography; for example, such symbols as the fish (ikhthus) were not borrowed from pagan iconography.

Early Christian art is generally divided into two periods by scholars: before and after either the Edict of Milan of 313, bringing the so-called Triumph of the Church under Constantine, or the First Council of Nicea in 325. The earlier period being called the Pre-Constantinian or Ante-Nicene Period and the latter being the period of the First seven Ecumenical Councils. The end of the period of early Christian art, which is typically defined by art historians as being in the 5th–7th centuries, is thus a good deal later than the end of the period of early Christianity as typically defined by theologians and church historians, which is more often considered to end under Constantine, around 313–325.

== Symbols ==
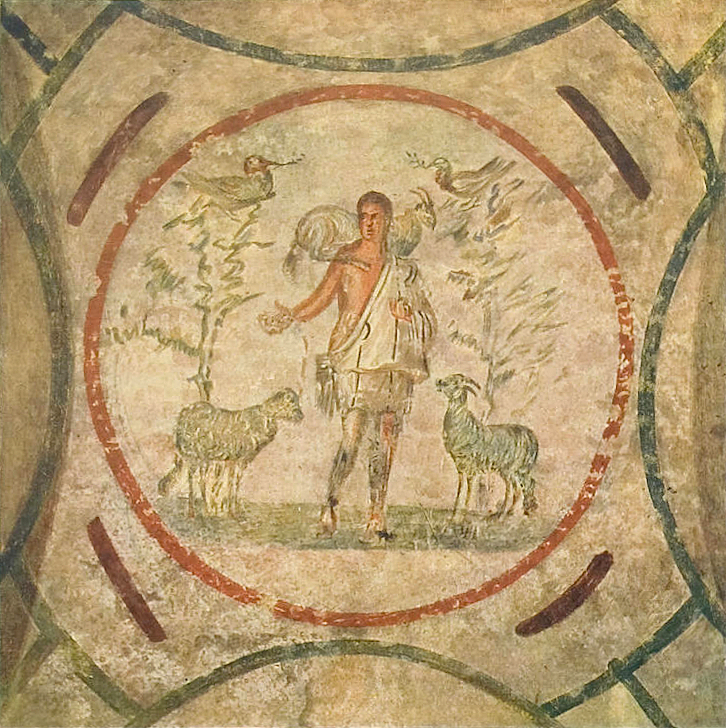
Good Shepherd from the Catacomb of Priscilla, 250–300

During the persecution of Christians under the Roman Empire, Christian art was necessarily and deliberately furtive and ambiguous, using imagery that was shared with pagan culture but had a special meaning for Christians. The earliest surviving Christian art comes from the late 2nd to early 4th centuries on the walls of Christian tombs in the catacombs of Rome. From literary evidence, there may well have been panel icons which, like almost all classical painting, have disappeared. Initially Jesus was represented indirectly by pictogram symbols such as the Ichthys (fish), peacock, Lamb of God, or an anchor (the Labarum or Chi-Rho was a later development). Later personified symbols were used, including Jonah, whose three days in the belly of the whale pre-figured the interval between the death and resurrection of Jesus, Daniel in the lion's den, or Orpheus' charming the animals. The image of "The Good Shepherd", a beardless youth in pastoral scenes collecting sheep, was the most common of these images, and was probably not understood as a portrait of the historical Jesus. These images bear some resemblance to depictions of kouros figures in Greco-Roman art. The "almost total absence from Christian monuments of the period of persecutions of the plain, unadorned cross" except in the disguised form of the anchor, is notable. The Cross, symbolizing Jesus' crucifixion on a cross, was not represented explicitly for several centuries, possibly because crucifixion was a punishment meted out to common criminals, but also because literary sources noted that it was a symbol recognised as specifically Christian, as the sign of the cross was made by Christians from very early on.

The popular conception that the Christian catacombs were "secret" or had to hide their affiliation is probably wrong; catacombs were large-scale commercial enterprises, usually sited just off major roads to the city, whose existence was well known. The inexplicit symbolic nature of many early Christian visual motifs may have had a function of discretion in other contexts, but on tombs, they probably reflect a lack of any other repertoire of Christian iconography.

The dove is a symbol of peace and purity. It can be found with a halo or celestial light. In one of the earliest known Trinitarian images, "the Throne of God as a Trinitarian image" (a marble relief carved c. 400 CE in the collection of the Prussian Cultural Heritage Foundation), the dove represents the Spirit. It is flying above an empty throne representing God, in the throne are a chlamys (cloak) and diadem representing the Son. The Chi-Rho monogram, XP, apparently first used by Constantine I, consists of the first two characters of the name 'Christos' in Greek.

== Christian art before 313 ==
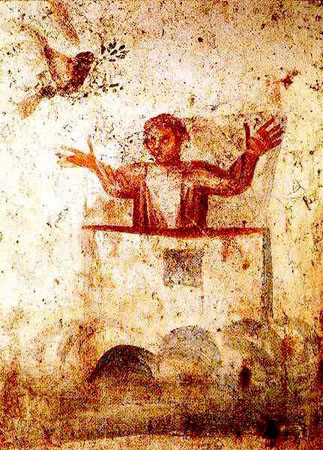
Noah praying in the Ark, from a Roman catacomb

A general assumption that early Christianity was generally aniconic, opposed to religious imagery in both theory and practice until about 200, has been challenged by Paul Corby Finney's analysis of early Christian writing and material remains (1994). This distinguishes three different sources of attitudes affecting early Christians on the issue: "first that humans could have a direct vision of God; second that they could not; and, third, that although humans could see God they were best advised not to look, and were strictly forbidden to represent what they had seen". These derived respectively from Greek and Near Eastern pagan religions, from Ancient Greek philosophy, and from the Jewish tradition and the Old Testament. Of the three, Finney concludes that "overall, Israel's aversion to sacred images influenced early Christianity considerably less than the Greek philosophical tradition of invisible deity apophatically defined", so placing less emphasis on the Jewish background of most of the first Christians than most traditional accounts. Finney suggests that "the reasons for the non-appearance of Christian art before 200 have nothing to do with principled aversion to art, with other-worldliness, or with anti-materialism. The truth is simple and mundane: Christians lacked land and capital. Art requires both. As soon as they began to acquire land and capital, Christians began to experiment with their own distinctive forms of art".

In the Dura-Europos church, of about 230–256, which is in the best condition of the surviving very early churches, there are frescos of biblical scenes including a figure of Jesus, as well as Christ as the Good Shepherd. The building was a normal house apparently converted to use as a church. The main meeting hall was created by removing a wall between two rooms, while another room across the courtyard was converted into a baptistery. The earliest Christian paintings in the Catacombs of Rome are from a few decades before, and these represent the largest body of examples of Christian art from the pre-Constantinian period, with hundreds of examples decorating tombs or family tomb-chambers. Many are simple symbols, but there are numerous figure paintings either showing orants or female praying figures, usually representing the deceased person, or figures or shorthand scenes from the bible and Christian history.

The style of the catacomb paintings, and the entirety of many decorative elements, are effectively identical to those of the catacombs of other religious groups, whether conventional pagans following Ancient Roman religion, or Jews or followers of the Roman mystery religions. The quality of the painting is low compared to the large houses of the rich, which provide the other main corpus of painting surviving from the period, but the shorthand depiction of figures can have an expressive charm. A similar situation applies at Dura-Europos, where the decoration of the church is comparable in style and quality to that of the (larger and more lavishly painted) Dura-Europos synagogue and the Temple of Bel. At least in such smaller places, it seems that the available artists were used by all religious groups. It may also have been the case that the painted chambers in the catacombs were decorated in similar style to the best rooms of the homes of the better-off families buried in them, with Christian scenes and symbols replacing those from mythology, literature, paganism and eroticism, although we lack the evidence to confirm this. We do have the same scenes on small pieces in media such as pottery or glass, though less often from this pre-Constantinian period.

There was a preference for what are sometimes called "abbreviated" representations, small groups of say one to four figures forming a single motif which could be easily recognised as representing a particular incident. These vignettes fitted the Roman style of room decoration, set in compartments in a scheme with a geometrical structure (see gallery below). Biblical scenes of figures rescued from mortal danger were very popular; these represented both the Resurrection of Jesus, through typology, and the salvation of the soul of the deceased. Jonah and the whale, the Sacrifice of Isaac, Noah praying in the Ark (represented as an orant in a large box, perhaps with a dove carrying a branch), Moses striking the rock, Daniel in the lion's den and the Three Youths in the Fiery Furnace were all favourites, that could be easily depicted.

Early Christian sarcophagi were a much more expensive option, made of marble and often heavily decorated with scenes in very high relief, worked with drills. Free-standing statues that are unmistakably Christian are very rare, and never very large, as more common subjects such as the Good Shepherd were symbols appealing to several religious and philosophical groups, including Christians, and without context no affiliation can be given to them. Typically sculptures, where they appear, are of rather high quality. One exceptional group that seems clearly Christian is known as the Cleveland Statuettes of Jonah and the Whale, and consists of a group of small statuettes of about 270, including two busts of a young and fashionably dressed couple, from an unknown find-spot, possibly in modern Turkey. The other figures tell the story of Jonah in four pieces, with a Good Shepherd; how they were displayed remains mysterious.

The depiction of Jesus was well-developed by the end of the pre-Constantinian period. He was typically shown in narrative scenes, with a preference for New Testament miracles, and few of scenes from his Passion. A variety of different types of appearance were used, including the thin long-faced figure with long centrally-parted hair that was later to become the norm. But in the earliest images as many show a stocky and short-haired beardless figure in a short tunic, who can only be identified by his context. In many images of miracles Jesus carries a stick or wand, which he points at the subject of the miracle rather like a modern stage magician (though the wand is a good deal larger).

Saints are fairly often seen, with Peter and Paul, both martyred in Rome, by some way the most common in the catacombs there. Both already have their distinctive appearances, retained throughout the history of Christian art. Other saints may not be identifiable unless labelled with an inscription. In the same way some images may represent either the Last Supper or a contemporary agape feast.

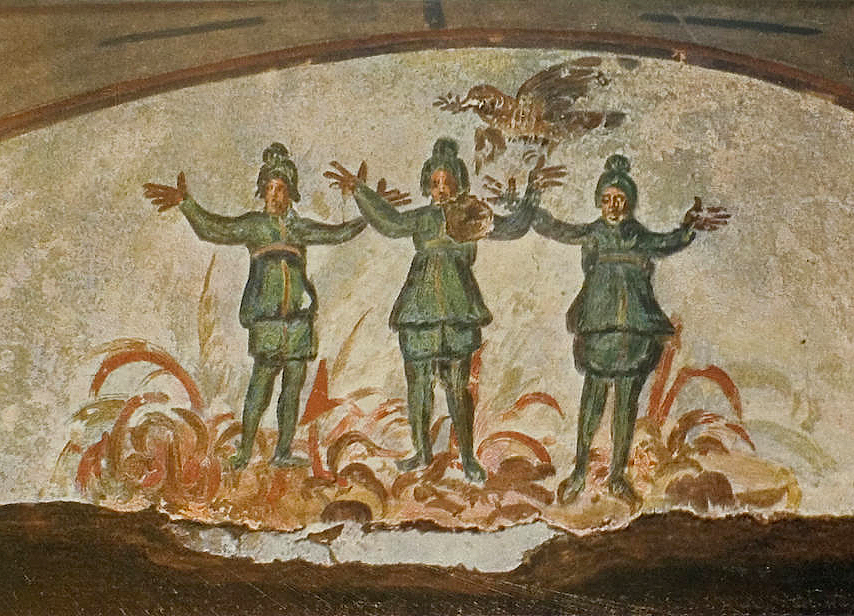
The Three Youths in the Fiery Furnace, catacomb of Priscilla

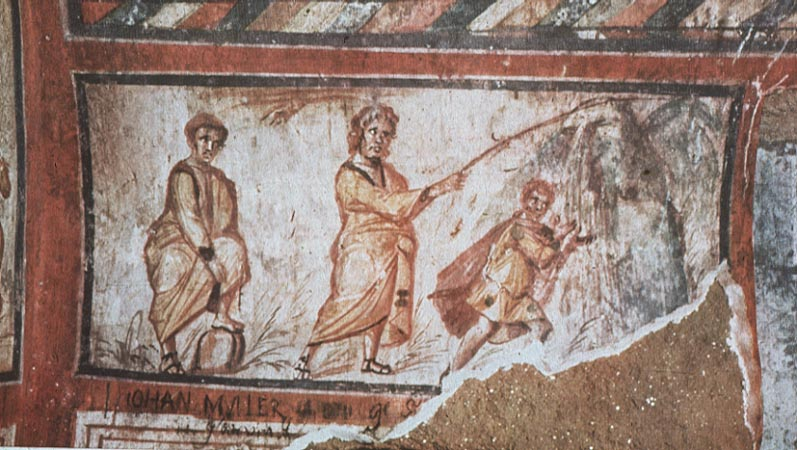
Moses striking the rock in the desert, a prototype of baptism

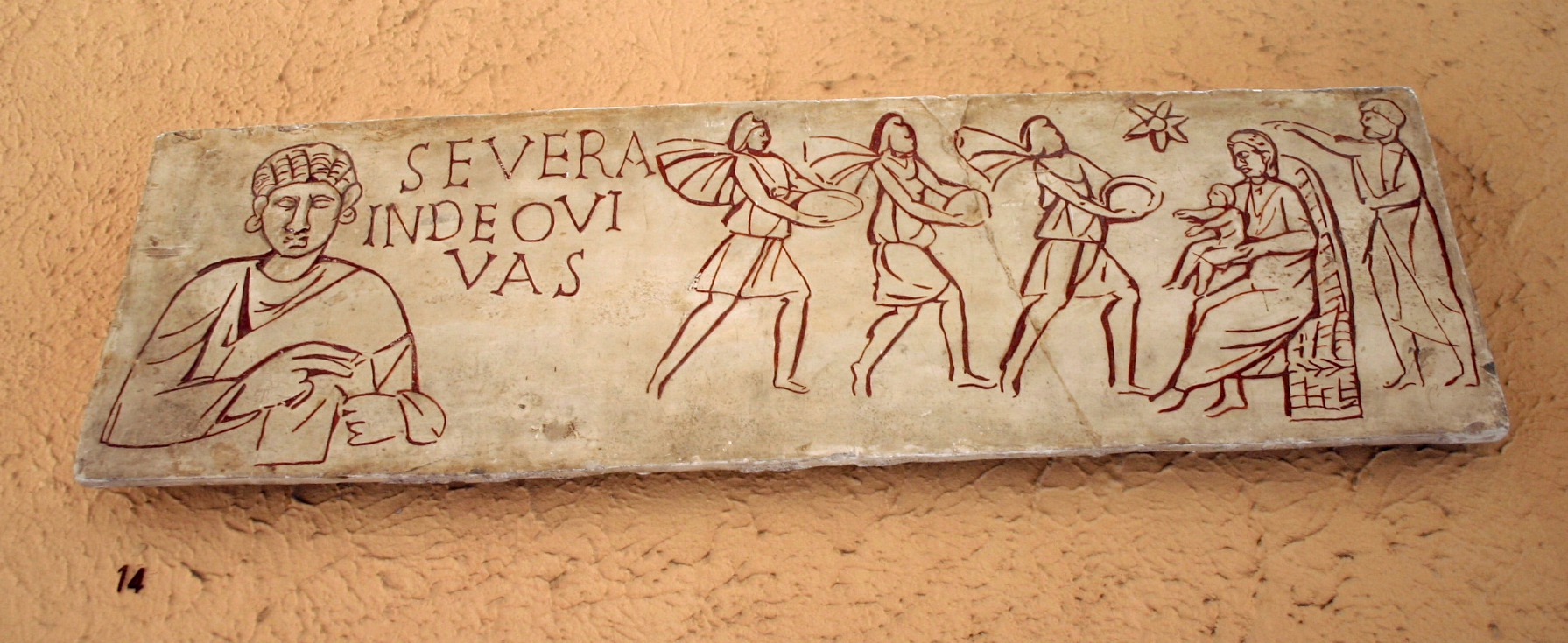
3rd-century cover for catacomb burial, engraved with the Adoration of the Magi (cast shown)

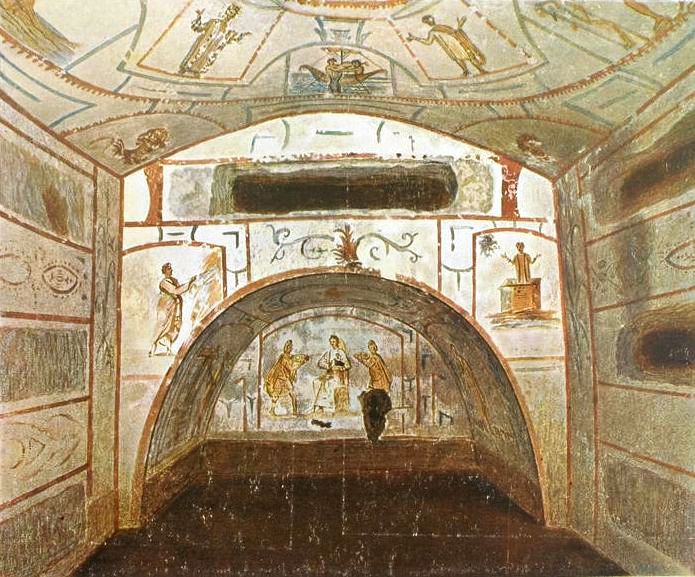
Catacomb chamber with (from top): Orants, Jonah and the Whale, Moses striking the rock (left), Noah praying in the ark, Adoration of the Magi. 200–250

== Christian architecture after 313 ==
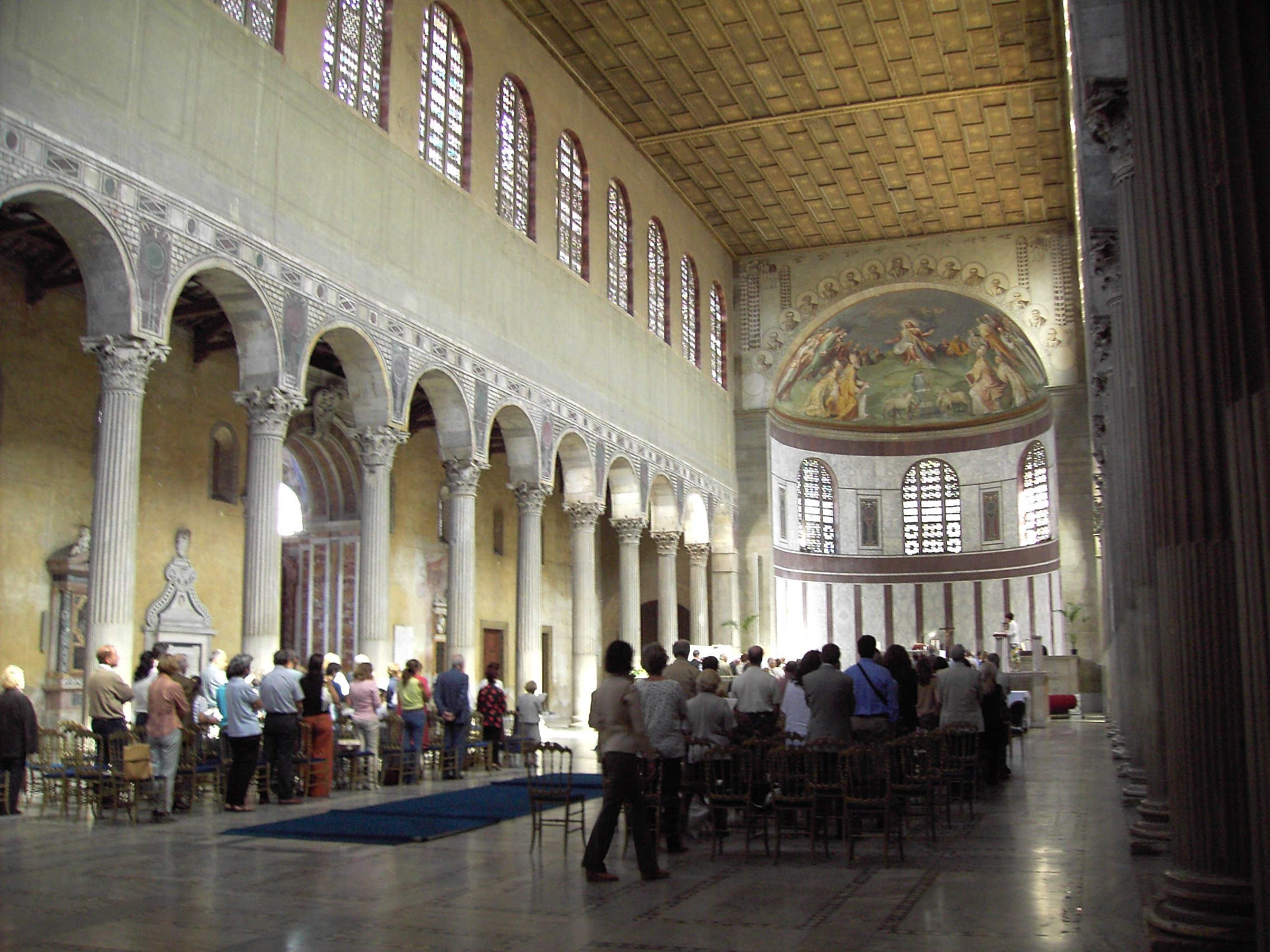
Santa Sabina, Rome, interior (5th century).

In the 4th century, the rapidly growing Christian population, now supported by the state, needed to build larger and grander public buildings for worship than the mostly discreet meeting places they had been using, which were typically in or among domestic buildings. Pagan temples remained in use for their original purposes for some time and, at least in Rome, even when deserted were shunned by Christians until the 6th or 7th centuries, when some were converted to churches. Elsewhere this happened sooner. Architectural formulas for temples were unsuitable, not simply for their pagan associations, but because pagan cult and sacrifices occurred outdoors under the open sky in the sight of the gods, with the temple, housing the cult figures and the treasury, as a windowless backdrop.

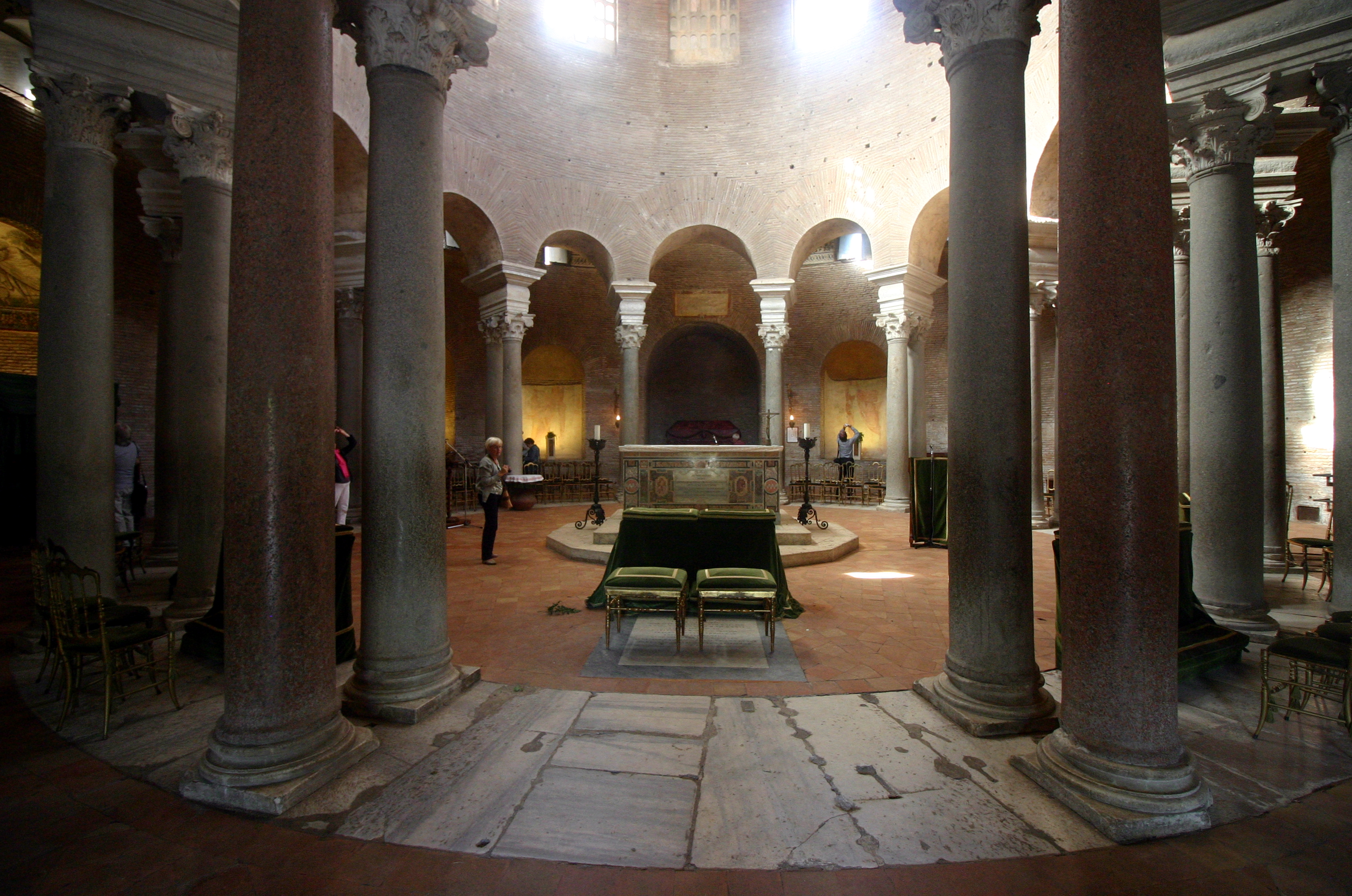
lnterior view of Santa Costanza, Rome

The usable model at hand, when Emperor Constantine I wanted to memorialize his imperial piety, was the familiar conventional architecture of the basilica. There were several variations of the basic plan of the secular basilica, always some kind of rectangular hall, but the one usually followed for churches had a center nave with one aisle at each side, and an apse at one end opposite to the main door at the other. The fifth-century Basilica of Santa Sabina in Rome followed this architectural plan and featured columns that were reused from an earlier pagan building. In, and often also in front of, the apse was a raised platform, where the altar was placed and the clergy officiated. In secular buildings this plan was more typically used for the smaller audience halls of the emperors, governors, and the very rich than for the great public basilicas functioning as law courts and other public purposes.

This was the normal pattern used for Roman churches, and generally in the Western Empire, but the Eastern Empire, and Roman Africa, were more adventurous, and their models were sometimes copied in the West, for example in Milan. All variations allowed natural light from windows high in the walls, a departure from the windowless sanctuaries of the temples of most previous religions, and this has remained a consistent feature of Christian church architecture. Formulas giving churches with a large central area were to become preferred in Byzantine architecture, which developed styles of basilica with a dome early on. Within the dome architecture Christian churches used them to venerate icons at a larger than life scale, while Christians remained covered and inside.

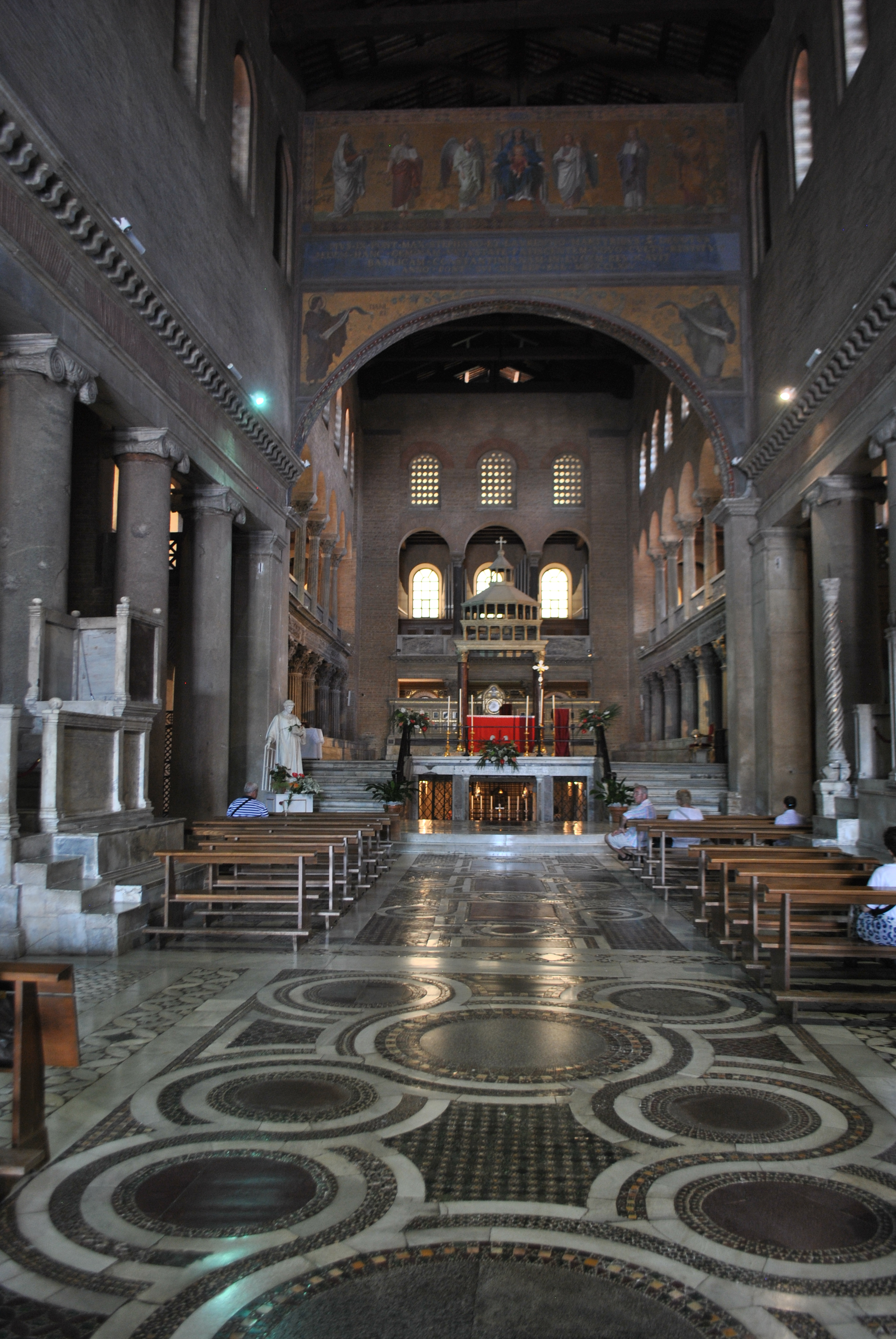
Nave of San Lorenzo fuori le mura, Rome

A particular and short-lived type of building, using the same basilican form, was the funerary hall, which was not a normal church, though the surviving examples long ago became regular churches, and they always offered funeral and memorial services, but a building erected in the Constantinian period as an indoor cemetery on a site connected with early Christian martyrs, such as a catacomb. The six examples built by Constantine outside the walls of Rome are: Old Saint Peter's Basilica, the older basilica dedicated to Saint Agnes of which Santa Costanza is now the only remaining element, San Sebastiano fuori le mura, San Lorenzo fuori le Mura, Santi Marcellino e Pietro al Laterano, and one in the modern park of Villa Gordiani.

A martyrium was a building erected on a spot with particular significance, often over the burial of a martyr. No particular architectural form was associated with the type, and they were often small. Many became churches, or chapels in larger churches erected adjoining them. With baptistries and mausolea, their often smaller size and different function made martyria suitable for architectural experimentation.

Among the key buildings, not all surviving in their original form, are:

- Constantinian Basilicas:
  - Archbasilica of Saint John Lateran
  - St Mary Major
  - Old Saint Peter's Basilica
  - Church of the Holy Sepulchre
  - Church of the Nativity
  - Saint Sofia Church, Sofia
- Centralized Plan
  - Santa Constanza, built as an Imperial mausoleum adjoining a funerary hall, part of the wall of which survives.
  - Church of St. George, Sofia
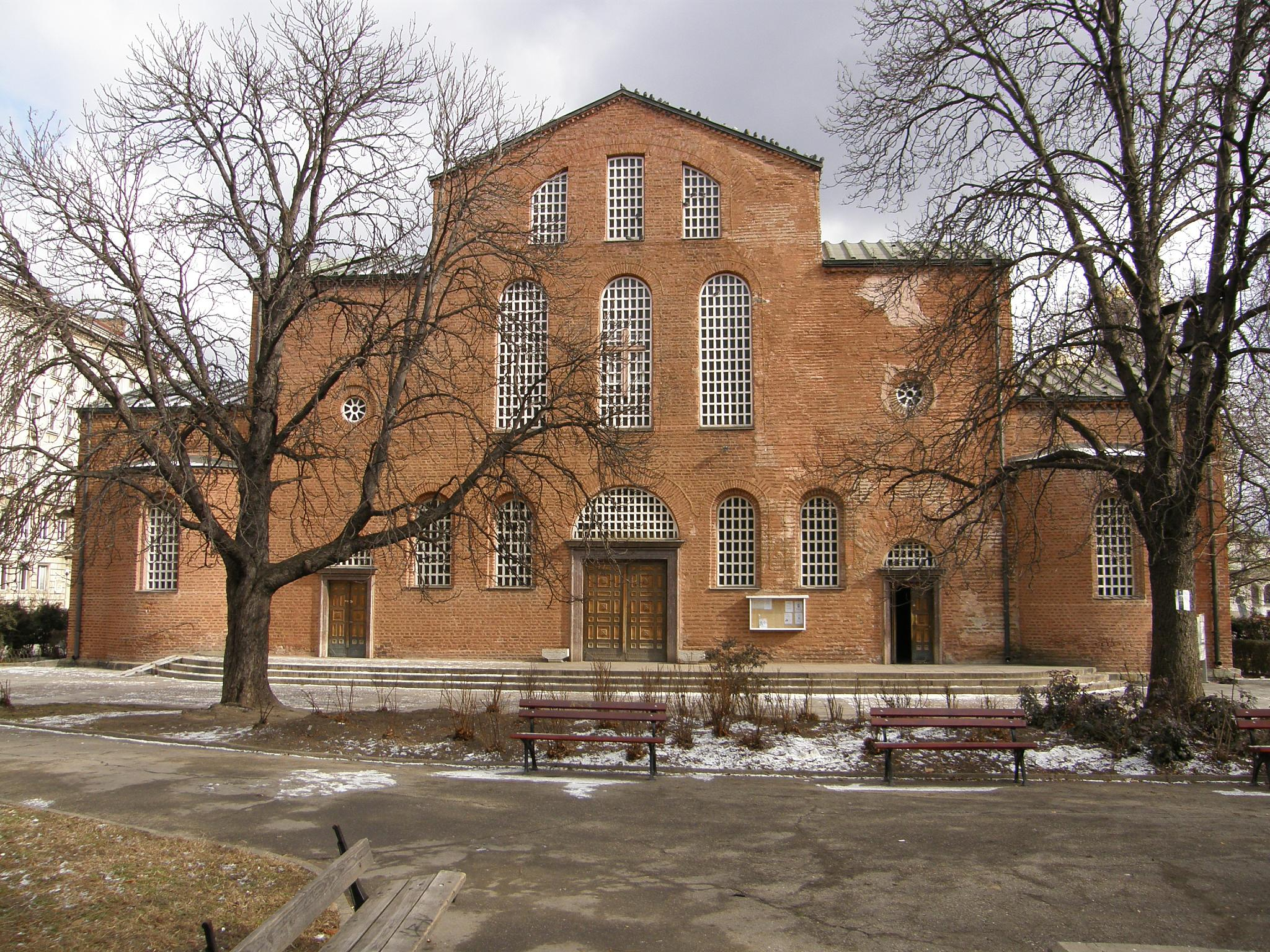
Exterior of the Basilica St. Sofia in Sofia, Bulgaria, 4th century CE

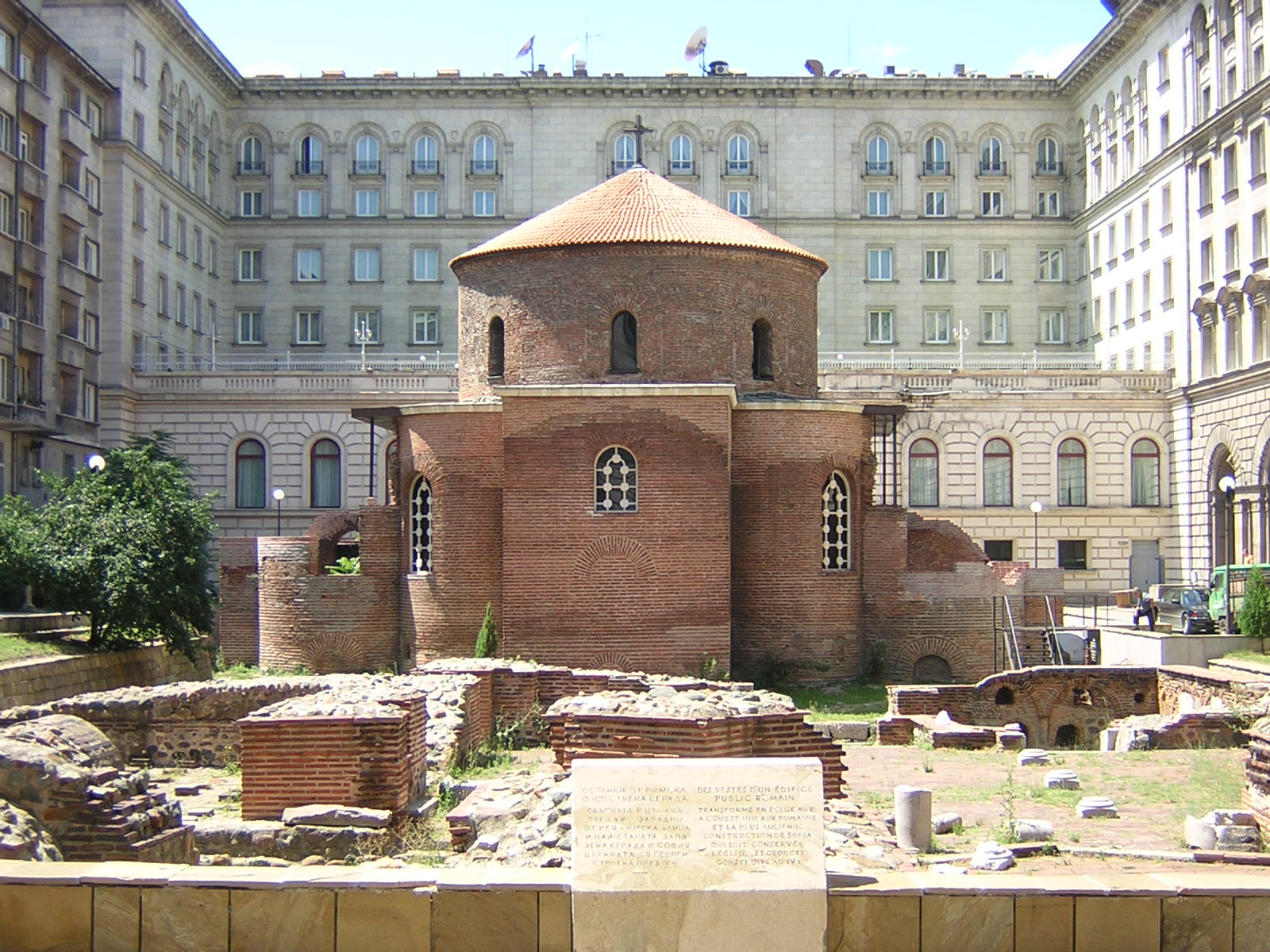
Exterior of the Rotunda St. George, Sofia, Bulgaria, 3rd-4th century CE

== Christian art after 313 ==
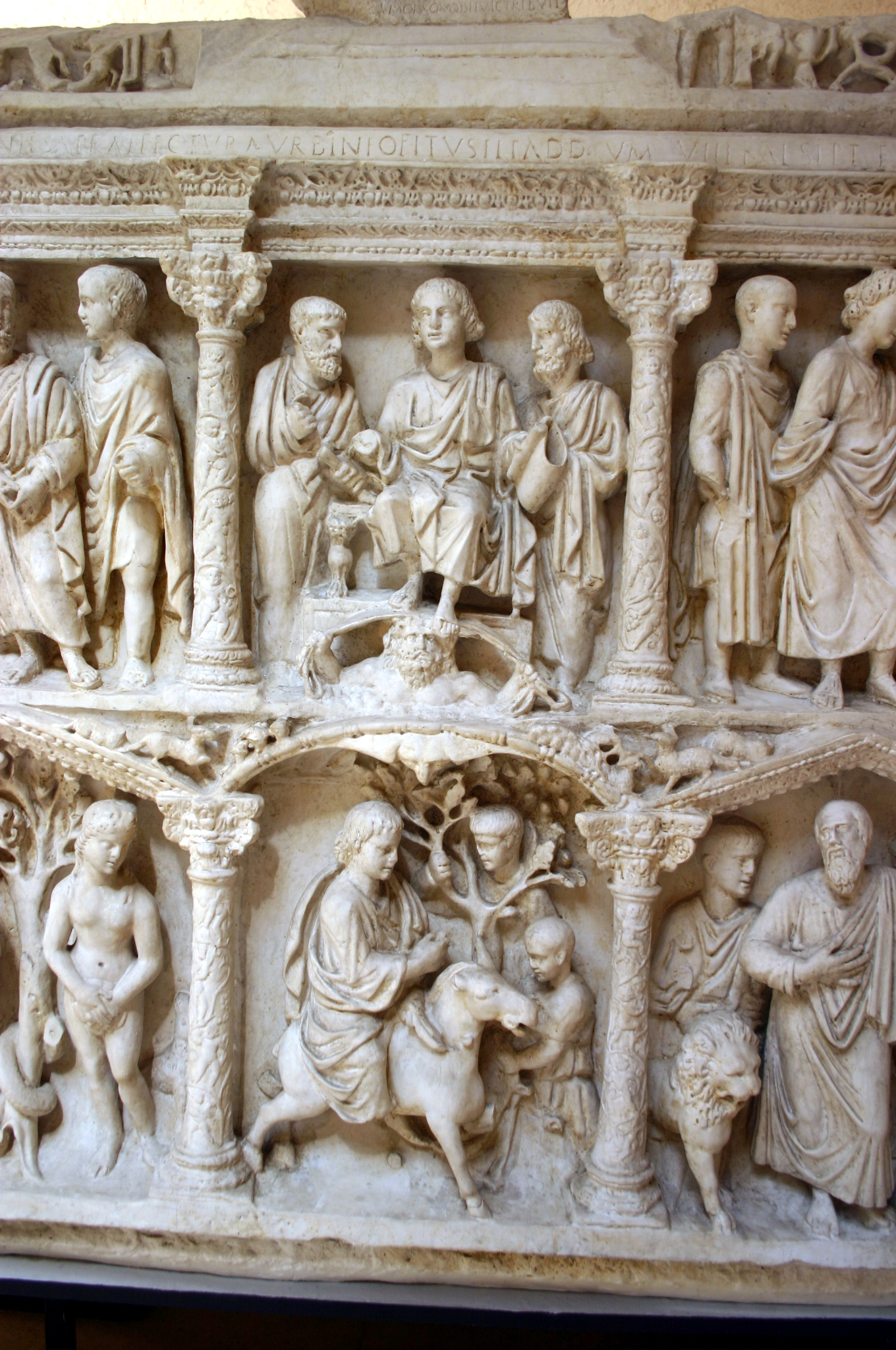
Detail - cast of the central sections of the Sarcophagus of Junius Bassus, with Traditio Legis and Jesus entering Jerusalem.

With the final legalization of Christianity, the existing styles of Christian art continued to develop, and take on a more monumental and iconic character. Before long very large Christian churches began to be constructed, and the majority of the rich elite adapted Christianity, and public and elite Christian art became grander to suit the new spaces and clients. Hans Belting wrote that "in late antiquity... Christianity adopted the cult images of the "pagans", in a complete reversal of its original attitude, and developed an image practice of its own." But large free-standing sculpture, the medium for the most prominent pagan images, continued to be distrusted and largely shunned for some centuries, and virtually up to the present day in the Orthodox world.

Although borrowings of motifs such as the Virgin and Child from pagan religious art had been pointed out as far back as the Protestant Reformation, when John Calvin and his followers gleefully used them as a stick with which to beat all Christian art, the belief of André Grabar, Andreas Alföldi, Ernst Kantorowicz and other early 20th-century art historians that Roman Imperial imagery was a much more significant influence "has become universally accepted". A book by Thomas F. Mathews in 1994 attempted to overturn this thesis, very largely denying influence from Imperial iconography in favour of a range of other secular and religious influence, but was roughly handled by academic reviewers.

More complex and expensive works are seen, as the wealthy gradually converted, and more theological complexity appears, as Christianity became subject to acrimonious doctrinal disputes. At the same time a very different type of art is found in the new public churches that were now being constructed. Somewhat by accident, the best group of survivals of these is from Rome where, together with Constantinople and Jerusalem, they were presumably at their most magnificent. Mosaic now becomes important; fortunately this survives far better than fresco, although it is vulnerable to well-meaning restoration and repair. It seems to have been an innovation of early Christian churches to put mosaics on the wall and use them for sacred subjects; previously, the technique had essentially been used for floors and walls in gardens. By the end of the period the style of using a gold ground had developed that continued to characterize Byzantine images, and many medieval Western ones.

With more space, narrative images containing many people develop in churches, and also begin to be seen in later catacomb paintings. Continuous rows of biblical scenes appear (rather high up) along the side walls of churches. The best-preserved 5th-century examples are the set of Old Testament scenes along the nave walls of Santa Maria Maggiore in Rome. These can be compared to the paintings of Dura-Europos, and probably also derive from a lost tradition of both Jewish and Christian illustrated manuscripts, as well as more general Roman precedents. The large apses contain images in an iconic style, which gradually developed to centre on a large figure, or later just the bust, of Christ, or later of the Virgin Mary. The earliest apses show a range of compositions that are new symbolic images of the Christian life and the Church.

No panel paintings, or "icons" from before the 6th century have survived in anything like an original condition, but they were clearly produced, and becoming more important throughout this period.

Sculpture, all much smaller than lifesize, has survived in better quantities. The most famous of a considerable number of surviving early Christian sarcophagi are perhaps the Sarcophagus of Junius Bassus and Dogmatic sarcophagus of the 4th century. A number of ivory carvings have survived, including the complex late-5th-century Brescia Casket, probably a product of Saint Ambrose's episcopate in Milan, then the seat of the Imperial court, and the 6th-century Throne of Maximian from the Byzantine Italian capital of Ravenna.

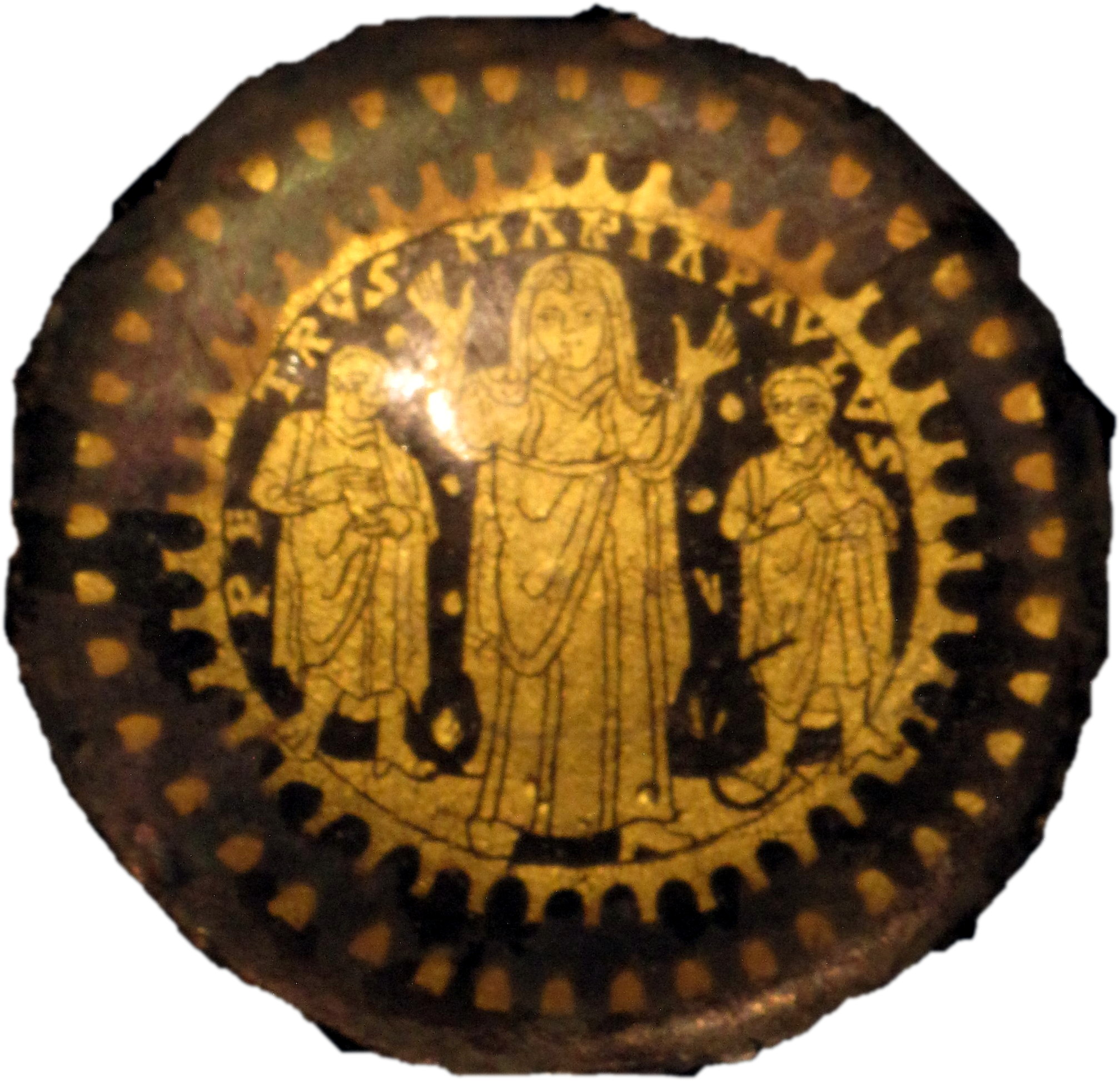
Gold glass from the catacombs, with Saint Peter, Virgin Mary in orant pose, Saint Paul, 4th century

- Manuscripts
  - Quedlinburg Itala fragment – 5th-century Old Testament
  - Vienna Genesis
  - Rossano Gospels
  - Cotton Genesis
- Late Antique mosaics in Italy and Early Byzantine mosaics in the Middle East.

=== Gold glass ===
Gold sandwich glass or gold glass was a technique for fixing a layer of gold leaf with a design between two fused layers of glass, developed in Hellenistic glass and revived in the 3rd century. There are a very fewer larger designs, but the great majority of the around 500 survivals are roundels that are the cut-off bottoms of wine cups or glasses used to mark and decorate graves in the Catacombs of Rome by pressing them into the mortar. The great majority are 4th century, extending into the 5th century. Most are Christian, but many pagan and a few Jewish, and had probably originally been given as gifts on marriage, or festive occasions such as New Year. Their iconography has been much studied, although artistically they are relatively unsophisticated. Their subjects are similar to the catacomb paintings, but with a difference balance including more portraiture of the deceased (usually, it is presumed). The progression to an increased number of images of saints can be seen in them. The same technique began to be used for gold tesserae for mosaics in the mid-1st century in Rome, and by the 5th century these had become the standard background for religious mosaics.

== Bibliography ==
- Dr. Allen Farber, "Early Christian art and architecture after Constantine," in Smarthistory, August 8, 2015, accessed September 26, 2026, https://smarthistory.org/early-christian-art-and-architecture-after-constantine/.
- Early Christian Art and Architecture." Internet Archive, 13 Jan. 1988, Accessed 13 Jan. 2021. https://archive.org/details/earlychristianar0000milb_d9c4/mode/2up
- Dr. Allen Farber, "Early Christian art," in Smarthistory, August 8, 2015, accessed September 26, 2026, https://smarthistory.org/early-christian-art/ and Byzantine Art." Ed Tech Book, 8 Aug. 2014, Accessed 3 Jan. 2023.https://open.byu.edu/history_of_the_fine_arts_music/byzantine_art
- Yale University Art Gallery. “Christian Building.” Dura-Europos: Excavating Antiquity. https://duraeuropos.artgallery.yale.edu/christian-building. Accessed October 25, 2026.

== See also ==
- Oldest churches in the world
