= Junius Bassus (consul) =

Last Praetorian prefect of the Roman Empire

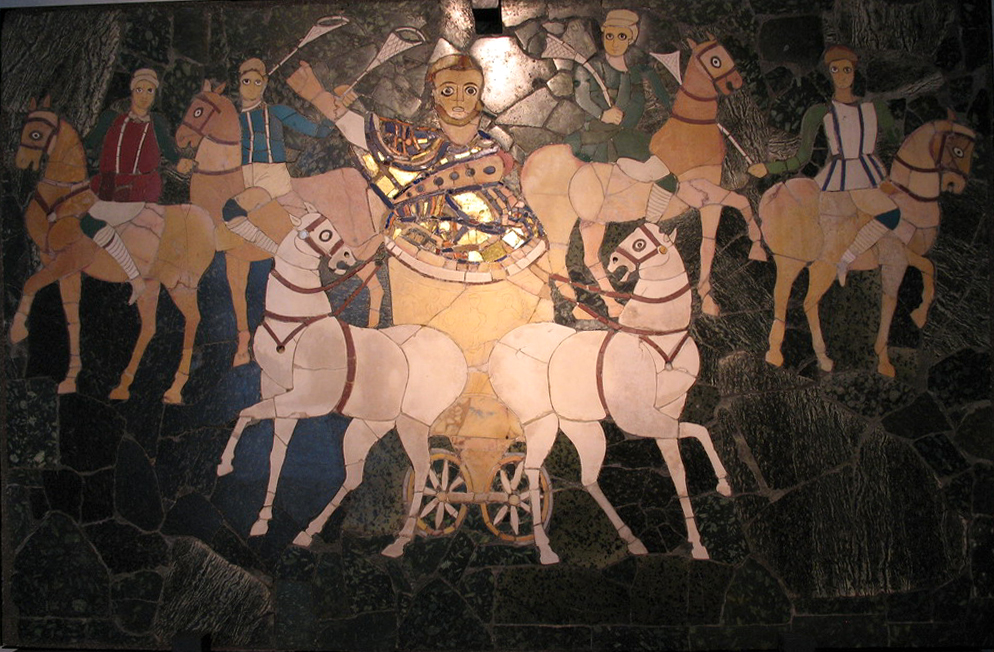
Junius Bassus in a chariot, opus sectile panel from the basilica of Junius Bassus on the Esquiline Hill

Junius Bassus was a praetorian prefect of the Roman Empire from 318 to 331, during which time he also held the consulate. Several laws in the Codex Theodosianus are addressed to him. His son Junius Bassus Theotecnius was praefectus urbi, and his sarcophagus from 359 is one of the most decorative late antique sarcophagi adorned with two registers of Christian scenes.

He built the basilica of Junius Bassus on the Esquiline Hill in Rome, famous for its opus sectile decoration.

== Bibliography ==
- Elsner, J.R., Imperial Rome and Christian Triumph: The Art of the Roman Empire AD 100-450, Oxford University Press, 1998, ISBN 0-19-284201-3, p. 192.
- Martindale, John R.; Jones, A. H. M.; Morris, John, eds. (1971). The Prosopography of the Later Roman Empire: Volume I, AD 260–395. Cambridge: Cambridge University Press. pp. 154–155. ISBN 0-521-07233-6.

Political offices
Preceded by Gallicanus; Aurelius Valerius Tullianus Symmachus	Roman consul 331; With: Ablabius	Succeeded by L. Papius Pacatianus; Mecilius Hilarianus
