= Junius Bassus Theotecnius =

Roman politician

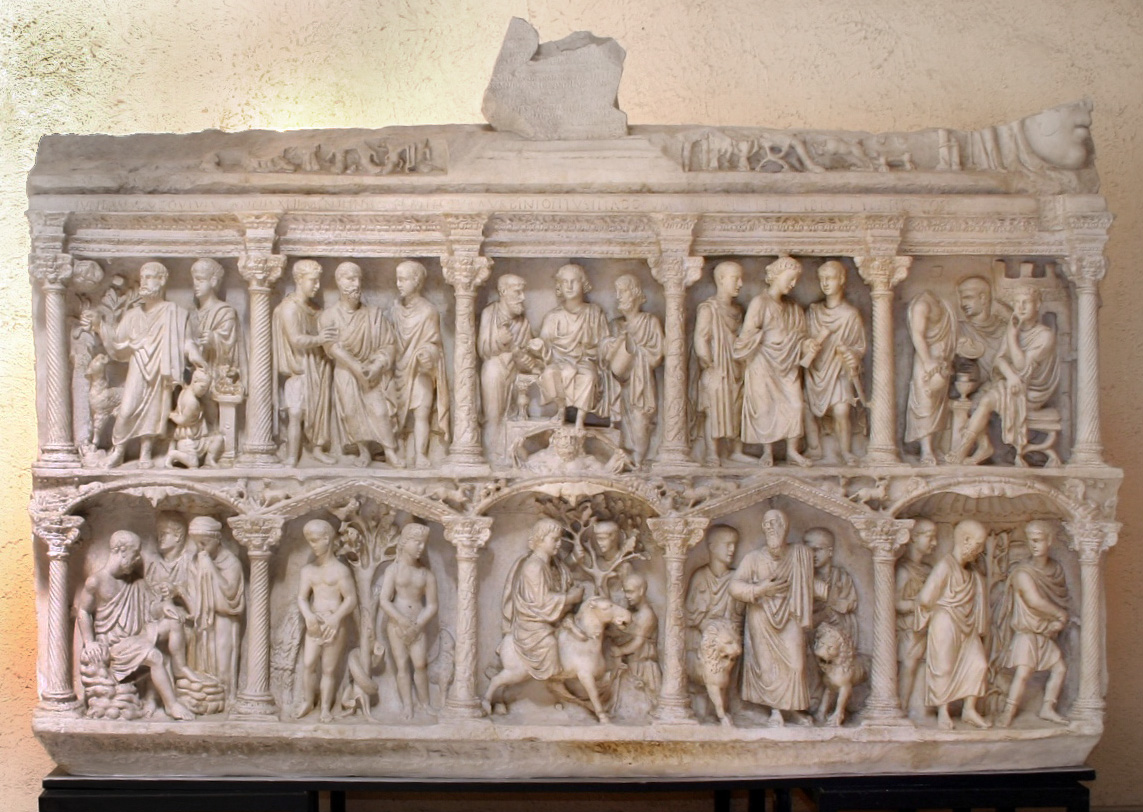
Sarcophagus of Junius Bassus (modern cast, Rome)

Junius Bassus signo Theotecnius (June 317 – 25 August 359) was an ancient Roman politician. The son of the praetorian prefect Junius Annius Bassus, he was vir clarissimus and vicarius of Rome as well as praefectus urbi from 25 March to 25 August 359.

The important Sarcophagus of Junius Bassus in the Vatican Museums shows him to have been a Christian.

Junius Bassus was an important figure, a senator who was in charge of the government of the capital as praefectus urbi when he died at the age of 42 in 359. His father had been Praetorian prefect, running the administration of a large part of the Western Empire. Bassus served under Constantius II, son of Constantine I. Bassus, as the inscription on the sarcophagus tells us, converted to Christianity shortly before his death – perhaps on his deathbed. Many still believed, like Tertullian, that it was not possible to be an emperor and a Christian, which also went for the highest officials like Bassus.
