= Dogmatic Sarcophagus =

Christian sarcophagus dating to 320–350

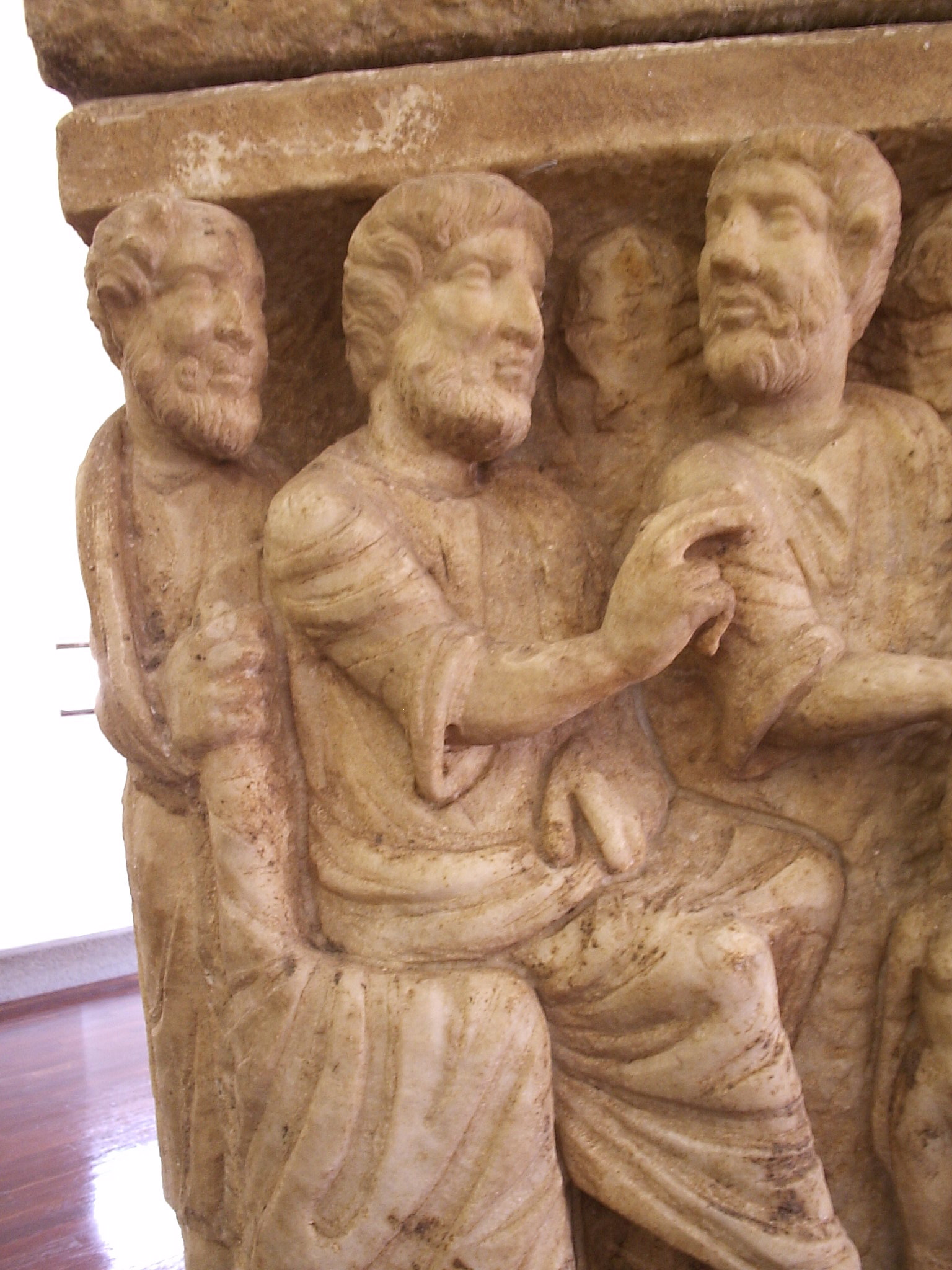
Three similar figures, representing the Trinity, are involved in the creation of Eve, whose much smaller figure is cut off at lower right. To her left, Adam lies on the ground.

The Dogmatic Sarcophagus, also known as the "Trinity Sarcophagus", is an early Christian sarcophagus dating to 320–350, now in the Vatican Museums (Vatican 104). It was discovered in the 19th century during rebuilding works at the basilica di San Paolo fuori le Mura, in Rome, Italy.

Together with the Sarcophagus of Junius Bassus, it one of the most important examples of Christian-Roman sculpture of the Constantinian era. It draws its name from its clear references to the dogmas of the Council of Nicaea (325), in particular to Christ being consubstantial with God the Father, as shown (for example) by the scene of a figure with the appearance of Jesus between Adam and Eve, though whether the figure is to be understood as Christ or God the Father is less clear – the dogmatic point works either way.

== Description ==
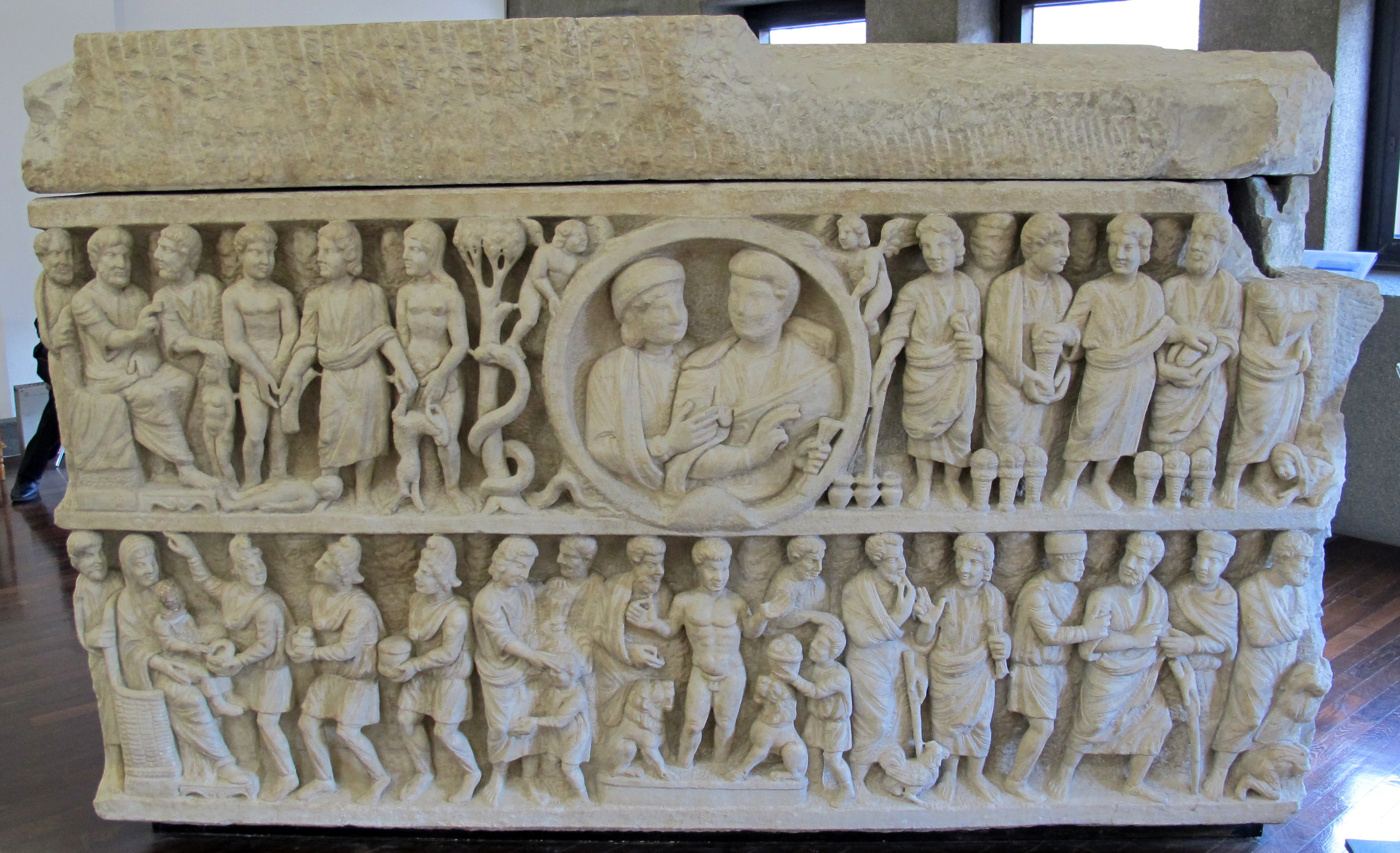
Dogmatic Sarcophagus, front face.

The front face is split into two registers, typical of the style of the time, with Old Testament and New Testament subjects and a central shell-shaped clipeus containing the portraits of the dead couple, embraced and wearing marital clothes typical of the 4th century (tunica manicata, dalmatina and toga contabulata by the man, who holds a rotulus in his hand, and tunic and palla by the woman). The heads are basic types, showing there was either no desire or not enough time to personalize the sarcophagus.

In the upper register are five episodes, two from the book of Genesis and three miracles of Christ:

- Three similar bearded figures representing the Trinity, the middle enthroned representing God the Father, creating Eve from the rib of Adam, who lies on the ground.
- A younger, beardless, figure with the conventional appearance of Christ between Adam and Eve, and the Tree of the Knowledge of Good and Evil.
- Marriage at Cana
- Multiplication of the loaves
- Resurrection of Lazarus

In the lower register are six scenes, one linked to Christ's birth, two to the Bible and three to St Peter:

- Adoration of the Magi, with an enthroned Virgin and Child, and with Magi in oriental dress and Phrygian caps, and with Saint Joseph or Balaam behind the throne
- Healing the blind
- Daniel in the lions' den
- Habbakuk with the basket of loaves and the angel
- Peter denying Christ, with the crowing cockerel from the Gospel account
- Peter's arrest, by two soldiers wearing Pannonian caps
- Moses or Peter creating a spring of water in the presence of a centurion (with the latter wearing typical 4th century military dress)

The sarcophagus can be dated to between 330 and 340 due to the male hairstyles (apart from those of Christ and Peter), the squat square figures and the lack of calligraphic detail. There are echoes of the previous "plebeian" official art, which has led some to suggest that the sarcophagus is from the same workshop that produced and amended the reliefs for the Arch of Constantine (dedicated in 315).

== Iconography ==
The account in Genesis naturally credits the Creation to the single figure of God, in Christian terms, God the Father. However the first person plural in Genesis 1:26 "And God said, Let us make man in our image, after our likeness", and New Testament references to Christ as creator (John 1:3, Colossians 1:15) led Early Christian writers to associate the Creation with the Logos, or pre-existing Christ.

A number of other sarcophagi in the same Vatican collection as the Dogmatic Sarcophagus, also show groups of three figures usually interpreted as representing the Trinity in scenes from Genesis. Sometimes one figure is beardless, while the other two are bearded. Given the funerary context, and that adjacent scenes often show New Testament miracles, including the Raising of Lazarus, the emphasis of these scenes may relate as much to the overcoming of sin and hope of new life as the Fall of Man.

Christ was compared to Adam in Romans 5:14–21, and was sometimes called the "new Adam", especially in connection with baptism (at this period catechumens were apparently naked when this was administered). This may also be referred to in the second scene, or the central figure may represent the Divine Logos, who is also shown with the appearance of Jesus. The scene represents the "division of labours" between Adam and Eve; the central figure holds a sheaf of corn in one hand and a dead hare (in another Vatican example a lamb) in the other, although one might expect hunting hares to be Adam's task and agriculture Eve's, rather than the opposite as the sarcophagus seems to suggest.

Adam and Eve also functioned as typological forerunners of Jesus and Mary, and the Tree of Knowledge of the Cross of the Crucifixion. In addition they represented faithfulness in marriage, and scenes of them between the Logos are interpreted by some as representing their marriage ceremony, suitable for the sarcophagus of a married couple.
