= Basilica of Junius Bassus =

Ancient Roman civic basilica in Rome

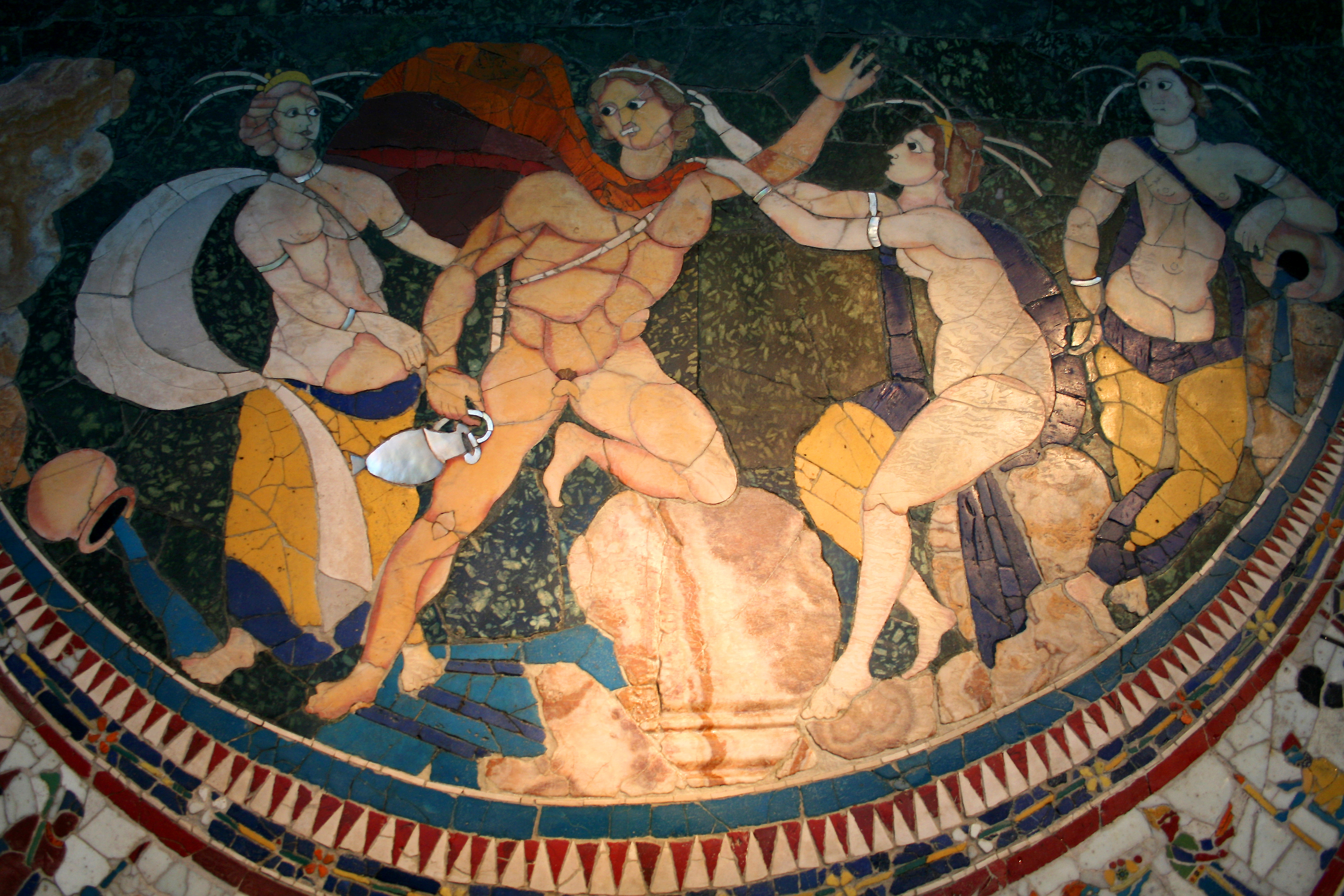
- Panel with Hylas and the nymphs and the Egyptian-themed decoration known as Alexandrine vellum

- Shown within Augustan Rome
- Click on the map for a fullscreen view
- 41°53′52″N 12°30′01″E
- Type: Basilica

The Basilica of Junius Bassus (Latin: basilica Iunii Bassi) was an ancient Roman civic basilica on the Esquiline Hill in Rome, on a site now occupied by the Pontifical Oriental Institute near the Piazza di Santa Maria Maggiore. It is best known for its surviving opus sectile mosaics that are preserved in the Capitoline Museums and the Museo Nazionale Romano.

== History ==
According to an inscription, the basilica was built on the estate of Junius Bassus in 331 at the start of his consulship. (Note: Latin: Iunius Bassus v(ir) c(larissimus) consul ordinarius propria impensa a solo fecit et dedicavit feliciter.) After serving as years as praetorian prefect for over a decade, his promotion to consul warrented his new status as a public benefactor, allowing him to construct a public basilica on his estate. The new public space signalled the new consul's willingness to engage with the public while displaying his aristocratic virtues.

It consisted of a simple apsidal hall with high clerestory windows, entered through a narthex with rounded ends and marble ornamentation throughout the interior. While none of the original structure survived after urban development on the site in 1930, a drawing by Renaissance artist Giuliano da Sangallo provides a glimpse into the interior decoration.

The marble ornamentation that survives, done in the technique known as opus sectile, depicts scenes of lions attacking calves, the abduction of Hylas, and a portrait of Junius Bassus on a chariot. This portrait, depicting Junius Bassus wearing his consular robes, presents the basilica's patron as a generous supporter of public entertainment. This, paired with the lion mosaics, reminded viewers of Junius Bassus's civic virtues and concern for the public welfare.

== Reuse ==
In the fifth century, a Romanized Gothic member of the city's elite named Valila acquired the property, possibly through a marriage alliance with the Bassus gens. After donating the basilica to the bishop, the structure was dedicated to Saint Andrew and proceeded to serve as a Christian place of worship. The inscription dedication to Junius Bassus remained, reflecting Valila's desire to transfer the honor of his predecessor to his own patronage of the Christian church and preserve the memory of Junius Bassus. The mosaics, with their pagan iconography, were also curiously preserved in syncretism with the new Christian imagery in the church. Art historian Gregor Kalas hypothesizes that the Christians reinterpreted the sexually violent imagery found in the panel depicting the abduction of Hylas as an allegory for the transformation of Rome from pagan to Christian in late Antiquity. A homily written during the time of Pope Gregory I (r. 590–640) describes the church in relation to the former ancient Roman basilica, reflecting a lasting memory of the site's pagan past. (Note: The homily reads in Latin: "Habita in basilica s. Andreae post Praesepe", which Armellini believes refers to the Basilica of Junius Bassius.)

After being slowly dismantled over the centuries, the structure was ultimately destroyed in the construction of the Pontifical Oriental Institute in 1930. Prior to that, the opus sectile mosaics were removed from the site and placed on display in the staircase of the Palazzo dei Conservatiri in 1903.

== Gallery ==
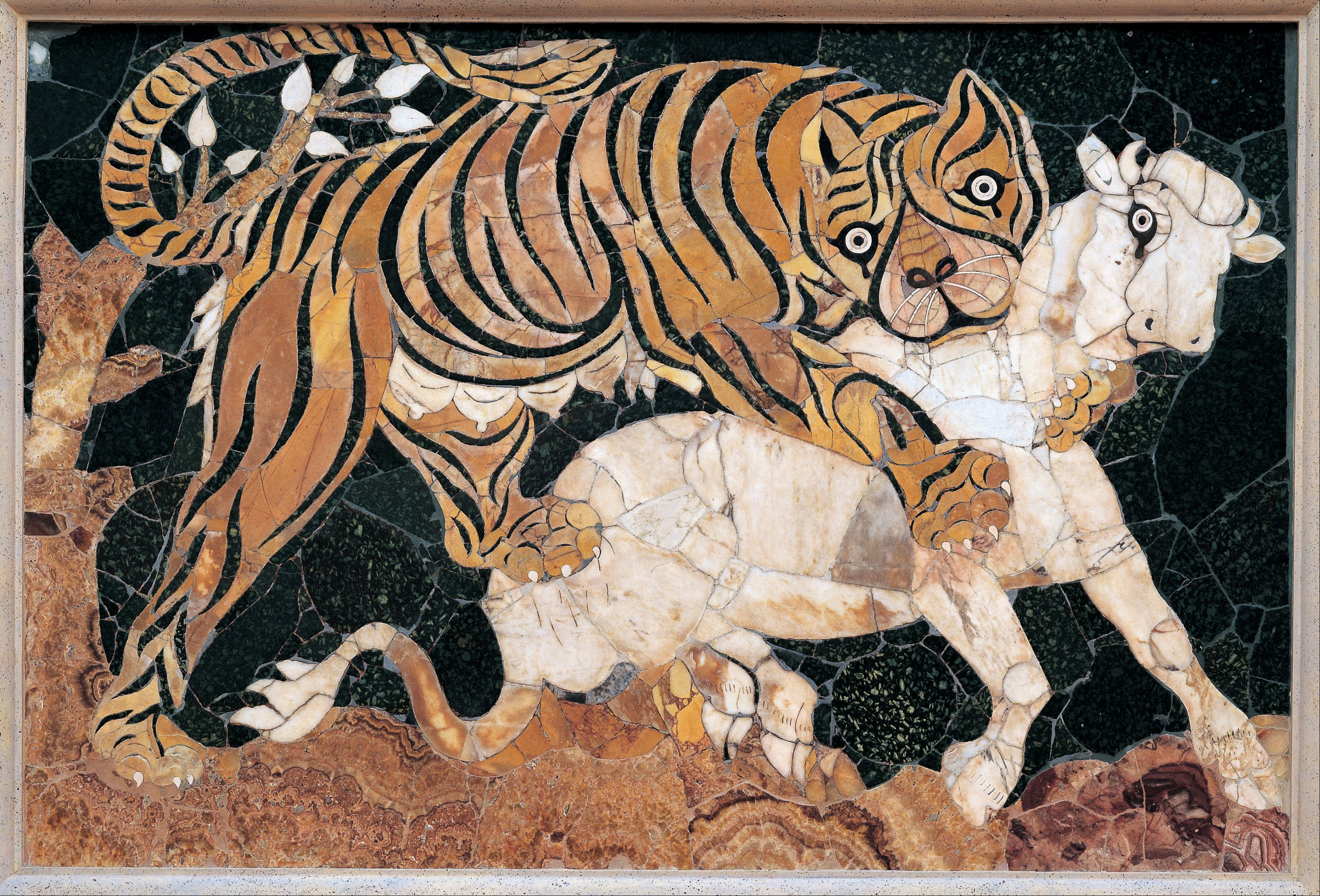
Tiger attacking a calf

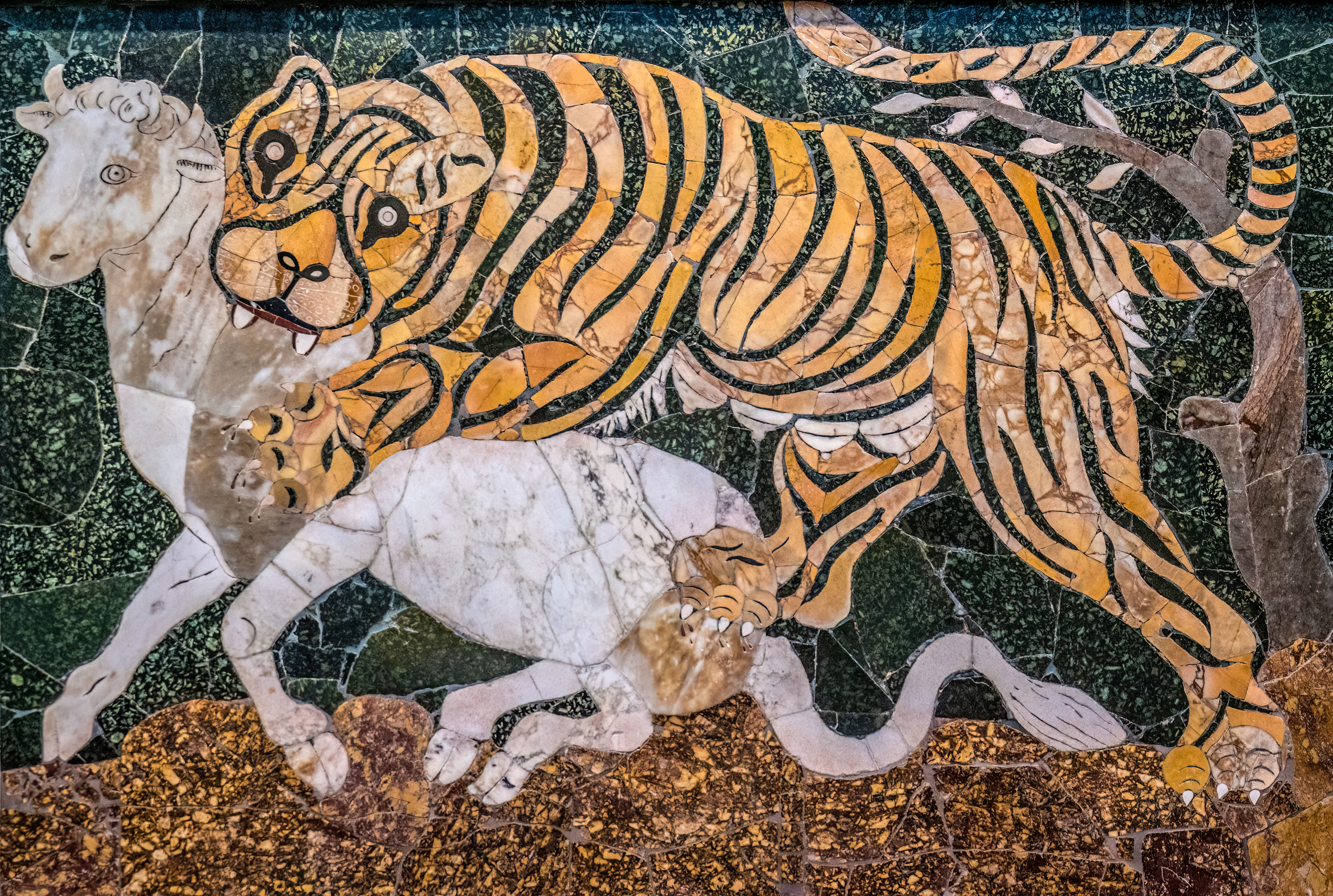
Tiger attacking a calf

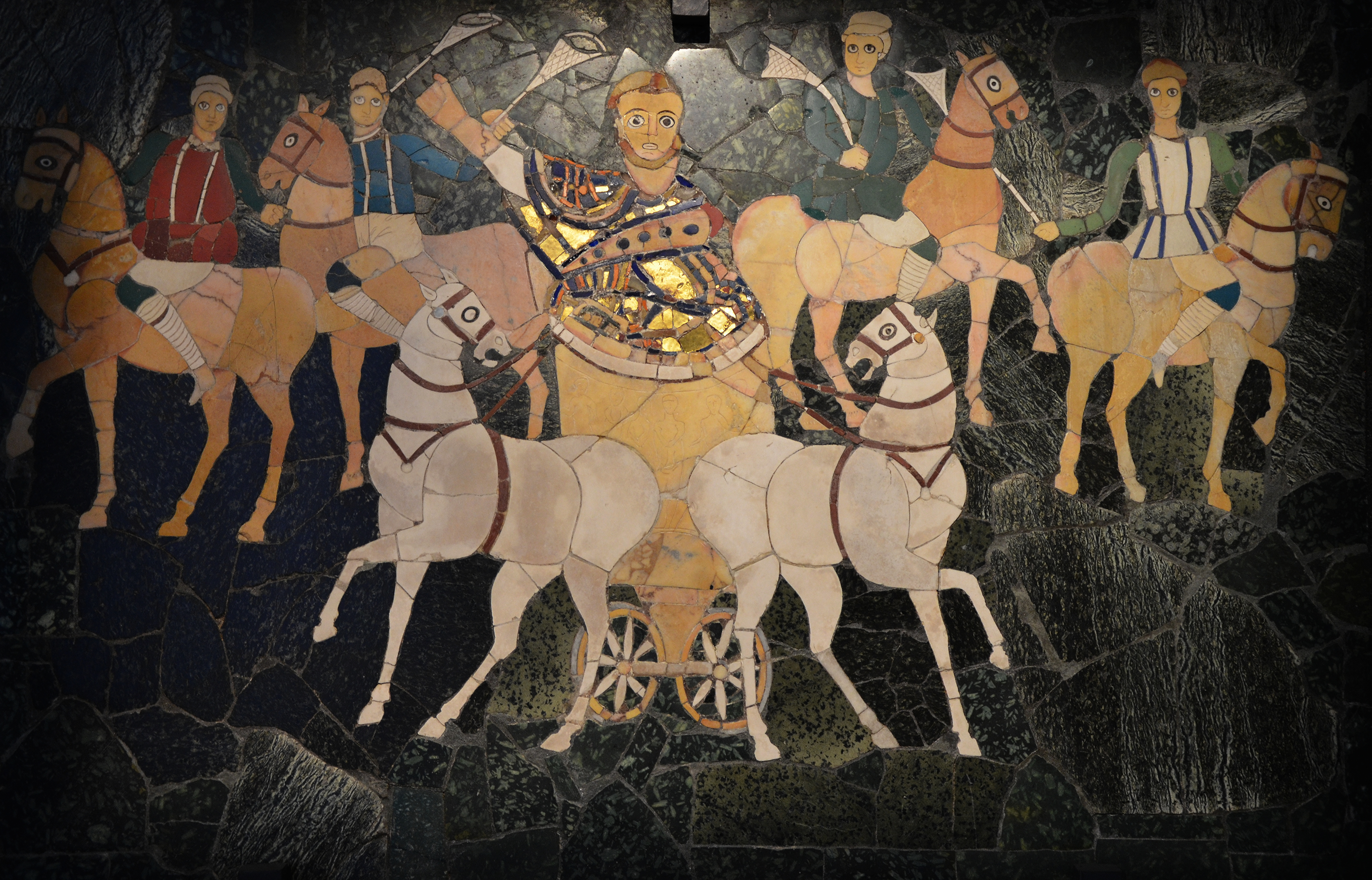
Junius Bassus on a chariot

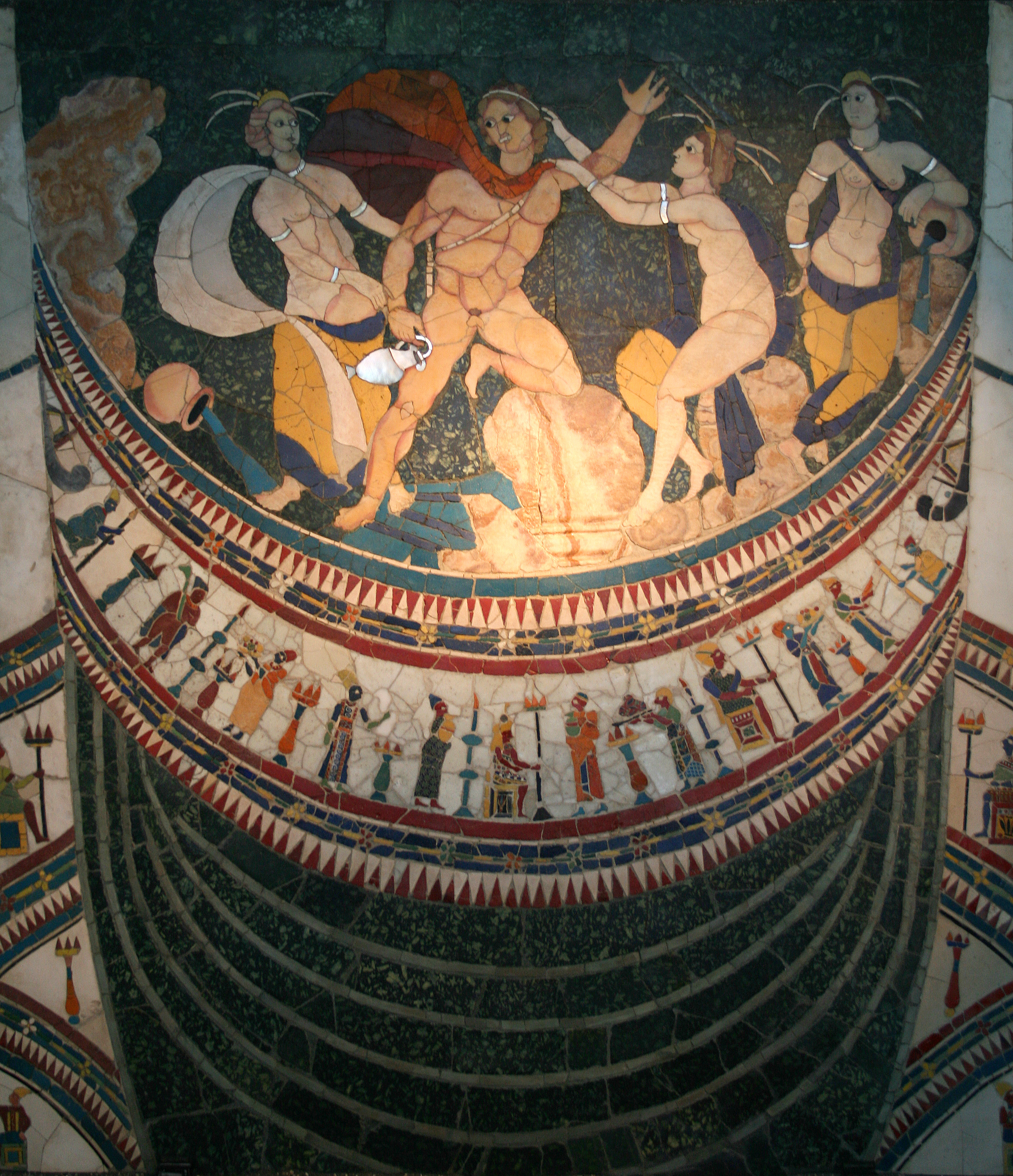
Abduction of Hylas

== Notes ==
| Preceded by Basilica Julia | Landmarks of Rome; Basilica of Junius Bassus | Succeeded by Basilica of Maxentius |
