= Prenestino-Labicano =

Q. VII Prenestino-Labicano
- Quartiere of Rome
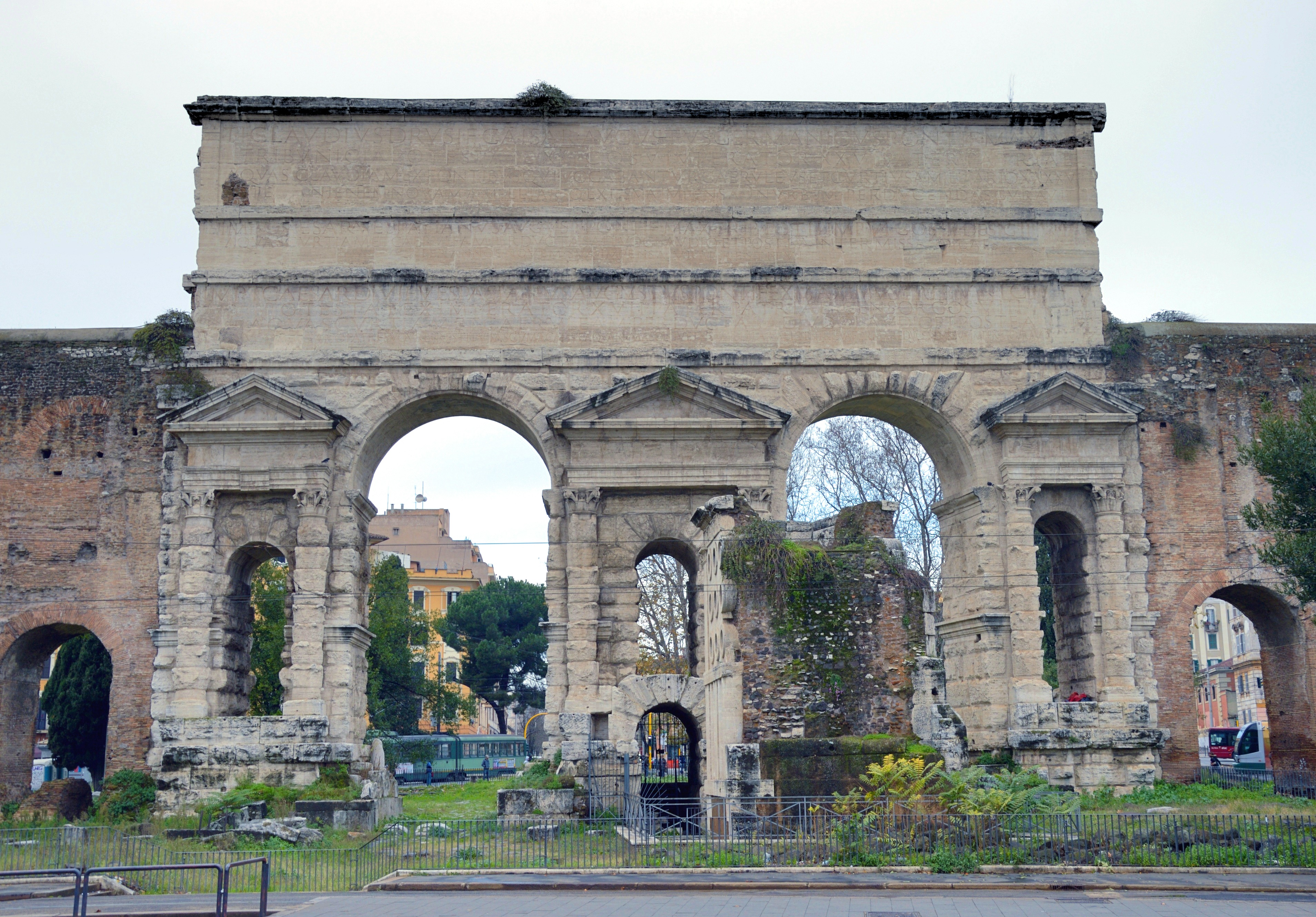
- Porta Maggiore

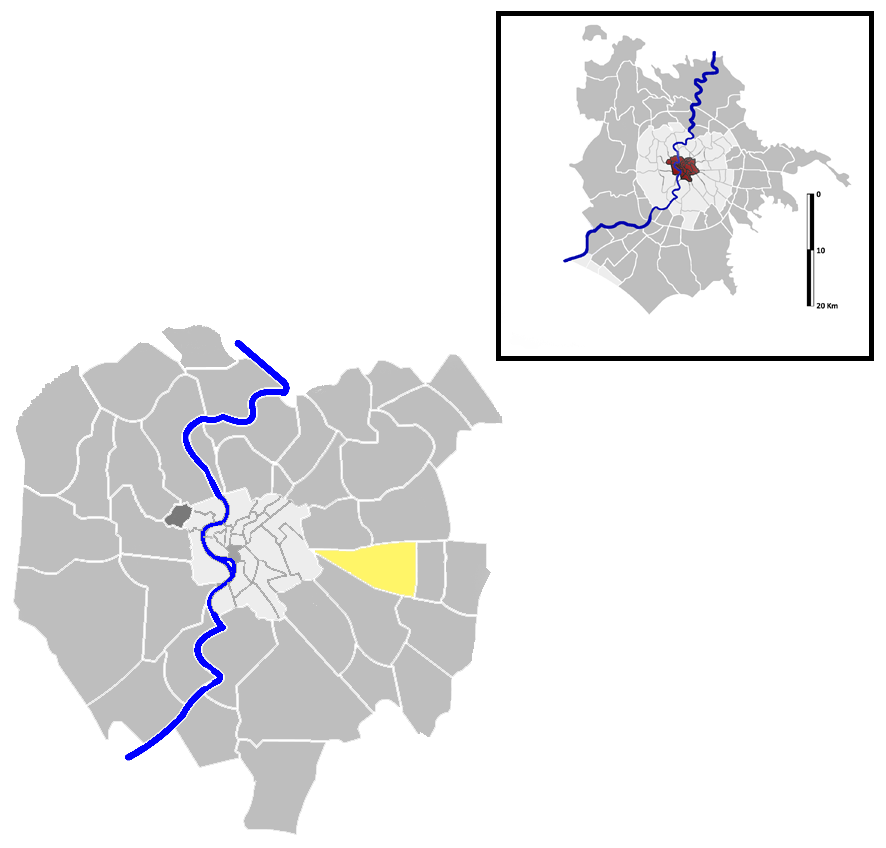
- Position of the quartiere within the city of Rome
- Country: Italy
- Region: Lazio
- Metropolitan City: Rome
- Comune: Rome
- Municipio: Municipio V Municipio VII
- Established: 20 August 1921

Area
  - Total: 1.8181 sq mi (4.7089 km^{2})

Population (2016)
  - Total: 72,661
- Time zone: UTC+1 (CET)
  - Summer (DST): UTC+2 (CEST)

Prenestino-Labicano is the 7th quartiere of Rome (Italy), identified by the initials Q. VII. The name derives from the ancient roads Via Prenestina and Via Labicana, today the initial stretch of Via Casilina. It belongs to the Municipio V and Municipio VII.

== History ==
Prenestino-Labicano is among the first 15 quarters of the city, which were born in 1911 and were officially established in 1921. In 1961 its territory was split in two parts, and the portion between Viale della Primavera and Viale Palmiro Togliatti became the new quartiere Prenestino-Centocelle (Q. XIX).

== Geography ==
The quartiere is located in the eastern part of Rome, just behind the Aurelian Walls and Porta Maggiore. The territory of Prenestino-Labicano includes the urban zones 6A Torpignattara, 6B Casilino, and 6D Gordiani.

=== Boundaries ===
To the north, the quarter borders with Quartiere Tiburtino (Q. VI), from which it is separated by the stretch of Via Prenestina between Piazzale Labicano and Largo Preneste, and with Quartiere Collatino (Q. XXII), the boundary being outlined by the stretch of Via Prenestina between Largo Preneste and Via Tor de' Schiavi.

Eastward, Prenestino-Labicano borders with Quartiere Prenestino-Centocelle, whose border is delineated by Via Tor de' Schiavi and Viale della Primavera.

Southward, the quarter borders with Quartiere Don Bosco (Q. XXIV), from which it is separated by the stretch of Via Casilina between Viale della Primavera and Via di Centocelle, as well as with Quartiere Tuscolano (Q. VIII), whose border is marked by the remaining portion of Via Casilina, up to Piazzale Labicano.

To the west, the quarter only shares a short border, crossing Piazzale Labicano, with Rione Esquilino (R. XV).

=== Odonymy ===
Besides the main roads, Via Prenestina and Via Casilina, and the streets and squares bearing a derivative name, such as Largo Preneste, Piazzale Prenestino, Via Labico, Piazzale Labicano and Vicolo Casilino, the odonyms of the quarter can be categorized as follows: gli odonimi del quartiere possono essere raggruppati nelle seguenti categorie:

- Condottieri, e.g. Via Alberto da Giussano, Via Muzio Attendolo, Via Braccio da Montone, Via Facino Cane, Via Erasmo Gattamelata, Via Fanfulla da Lodi, Via Niccolò Forteguerri, Via Luchino Dal Verme, Via Renzo da Ceri, Via e Piazza Roberto Malatesta, Via Sampiero di Bastelica.
- Geographers, e.g. Via Anassimandro Via Leonardo Bufalini, Piazza Copernico, Via Giovanni De Agostini, Via Fra Mauro, Via Frontino, Via Martino di Tiro Via Pietro Martire d'Anghiera Via Gerardo Mercatore Via Pausania, Largo and Via Bartolomeo Perestrello, Via Posidonio, Via Giovanni Battista Riccioli, Via Marin Sanudo, Via Strabone, Via Antonio Tempesta, Piazza Tolomeo.
- Local toponyms, e.g. Via di Acqua Bullicante, Via dei Due Allori, Via dei Gordiani, Via Tor de' Schiavi.
- Roman poets and authors, e.g. Via Romolo Balzani, Via Valentino Banal, Via Checco Durante, Via Mario Ugo Guattari, Piazzetta Gigi Huetter, Piazza Pio Pecchiai, Via Alceste Trionfi.
- Towns and regions of Campania, e.g. Via Aversa, Viale e Largo Irpinia, Via Maddaloni, Viale Partenope, Via Teano, Viale Telese, Via Torre del Greco.
- Towns of Italy, e.g. Via Ascoli Piceno, Via Avellino, Via Caltanissetta, Via Campobasso, Via Fivizzano, Via Grosseto, Via L'Aquila, Via Macerata, Via Pesaro, Via Sondrio.
- Towns of Lazio, e.g. Viale Agosta, Via Alatri, Via Anagni, Via Bassiano, Via Bellegra, Via Cori, Via Fiuggi, Via Fontana Liri, Via Formia, Via Norma, Via Olevano Romano, Via Pisterzo, Via Rocca Massima, Via Sabaudia, Via Terracina, Via Torre Cajetani.

== Places of interest ==
=== Civil buildings ===
- Villa Serventi, in Via Casilina. 19th-century villa (1860).
- Villa Valiani, in Via Romanello da Forlì. 20th-century villa (1929-30). 41.889713°N 12.532858°E

designed by architect Giovanni Michelucci.

=== Religious buildings ===
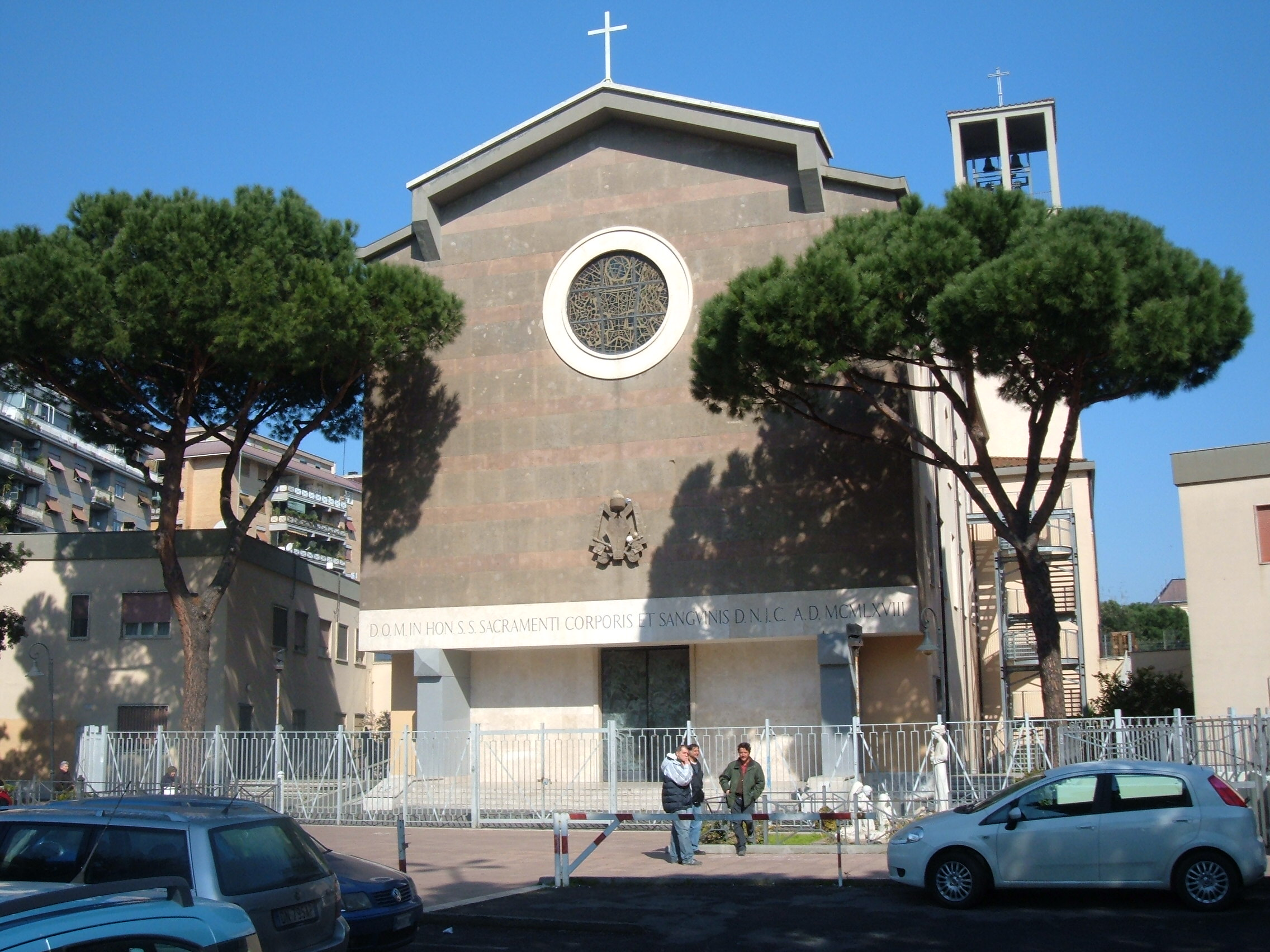
Church of Santissimo Sacramento a Tor de' Schiavi

- Sant'Elena, in Via Casilina. 20th-century church (1913-16).
- Santi Marcellino e Pietro ad Duas Lauros, in Via Casilina. 20th-century church (1922).
- San Leone I, in Via Prenestina. 20th-century church (1950-52).
- San Barnaba, in Via Giovanni Maggi. 20th-century church (1956-57).
- Santa Maria Madre della Misericordia, in Via dei Gordiani. 20th-century church.
- San Luca Evangelista, in Largo San Luca Evangelista. 20th-century church (1955-58).
- Santa Maria Mediatrice, in Via Cori. 20th-century church.
- Santissimo Sacramento a Tor de' Schiavi, in Largo Agosta. 20th-century church.
- San Gerardo Maiella, in Via Romolo Balzani. 20th-century church (1980-81).

=== Archaeological sites ===
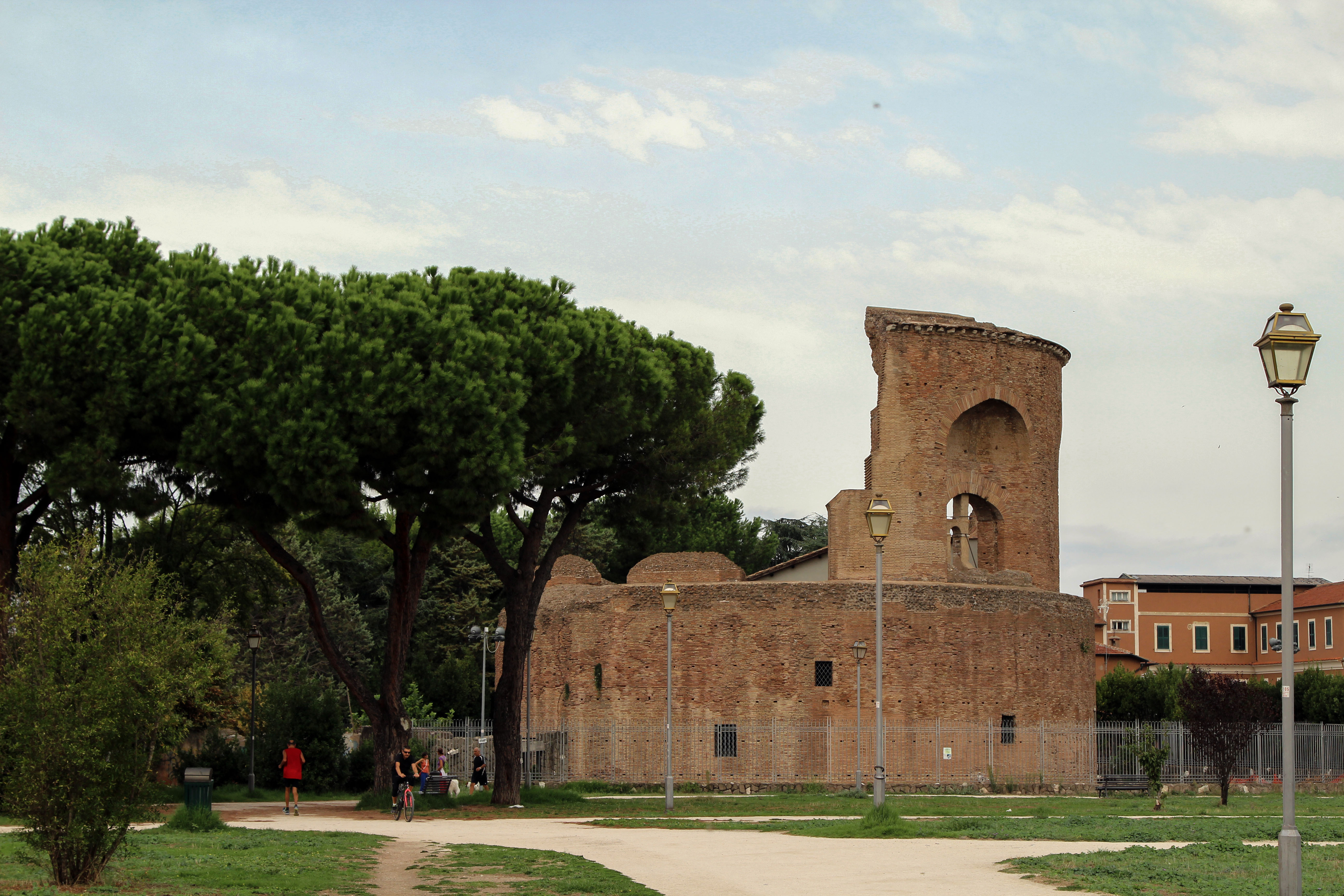
The mausoleum of Helena and the Villa De Sanctis

- Tomb of Eurysaces the Baker, in Piazzale Labicano.
- Porta Maggiore, between Piazzale Labicano and Piazza di Porta Maggiore.

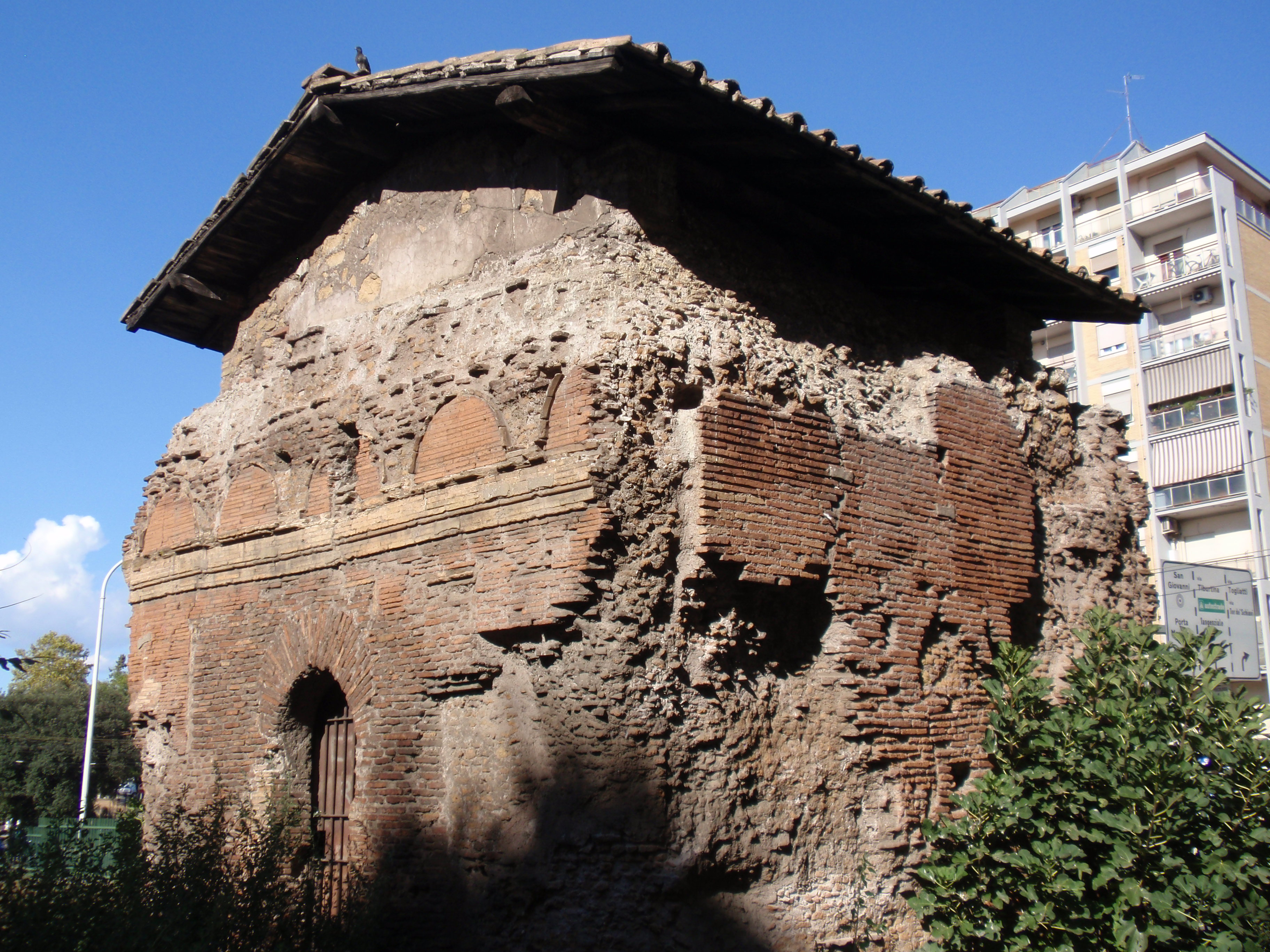
Columbarium in Largo Preneste

- Porta Maggiore Basilica, at the beginning of Via Prenestina.
- Columbarium in Largo Preneste. 2nd-century sepulchre.
- Villa Gordiani Archaeological Park
- Catacombs of Marcellinus and Peter, at Villa De Sanctis.
- Mausoleum of Helena, within the park of Villa De Sanctis.
- Sepulchre at Villa De Sanctis. Imperial age sepulchre. 41.877874°N 12.549759°E

=== Parks ===
- Parco Filippo Teoli.
- Parco Yasser Arafat.
