= Sarcophagi of Helena and Constantina =

Ancient Roman sarcophagi

The Sarcophagi of Helena and Constantina are two fourth century porphyry sarcophagi located in the Pio-Clementine Vatican Museum in Rome.

== Sarcophagus of Helena ==
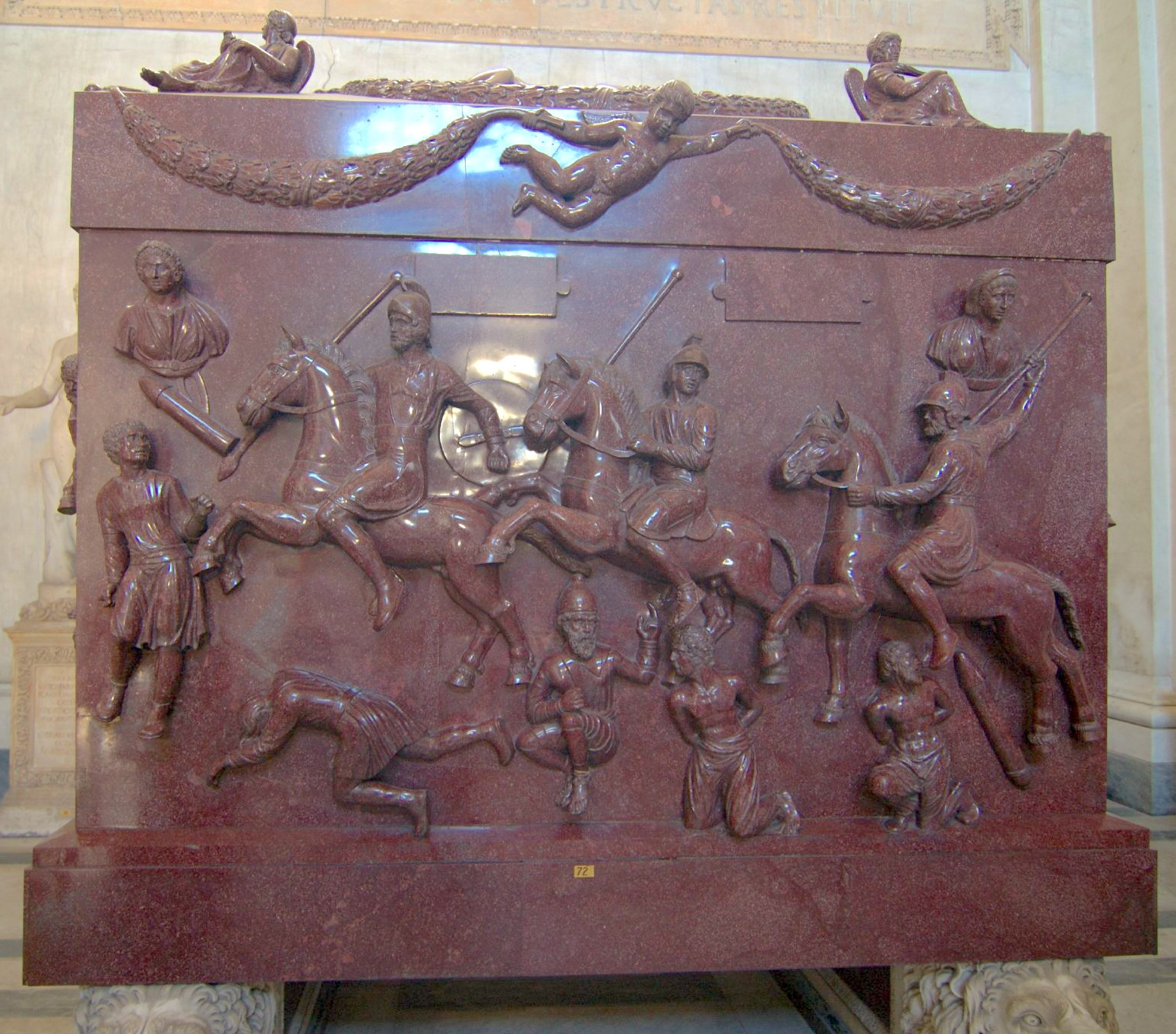
Sarcophagus of Helena

The Sarcophagus of Helena is the red porphyry coffin in which Saint Helena, the mother of emperor Constantine the Great, was buried (died 329). The coffin, deprived of its contents for centuries, was removed from the Mausoleum of Helena at Tor Pignatarra, just outside the walled city of Rome. In the 12th century it was moved to the Archbasilica of Saint John Lateran for the burial of Pope Anastasius IV. Pope Pius VI brought it to the Vatican in 1778, and now is in the Sala a Croce Greca of the Pio-Clementine Vatican Museum.

The Sarcophagus is carved in the Egyptian porphyry, used only in the finest Byzantine imperial monuments. It is noted that the carved imagery depicts victorious Roman Cavalry riding above captured barbarians. It is unclear if such imagery was intended for the sarcophagus of a highly religious Christian woman, or whether the coffin was repurposed for her burial, though the latter is considered unlikely as Helena, as the Emperor's mother, would likely have held enough esteem as to have had a custom-made coffin. It is 2.42 metres (7.9 ft) tall, 2.68 metres (8.8 ft) wide and 1.84 metres (6.0 ft) wide.

== Sarcophagus of Constantina ==
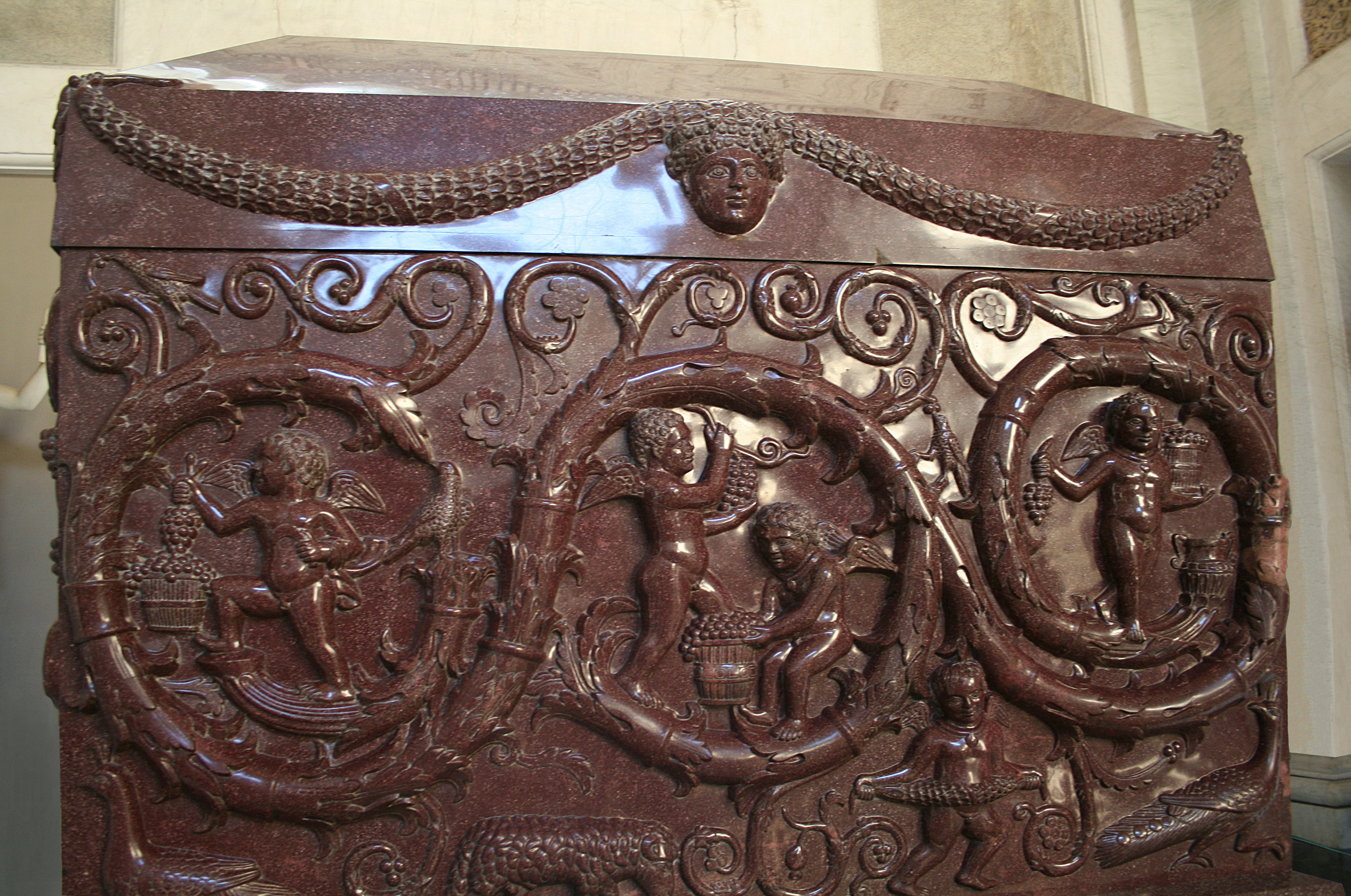
Sarcophagus of Constantina (340 AD)

In the same room is the Sarcophagus of Constantina, a second porphyry work that once housed the body of Constantina, daughter of Constantine the Great (died 354). This was once in her mausoleum on Via Nomentana, which became the church of Santa Costanza in 1254, and later to this museum. The decoration is a semi-pagan depictions of cupids in Dionysic harvesting of grapes to make wine; it has been interpreted as an early Christian reference to the eucharist.

== See also ==
- Ancient Roman sarcophagi
