= Santi Marcellino e Pietro ad Duas Lauros =

Church in Rome, Italy

Coordinates: 41.8783°N 12.5487°E

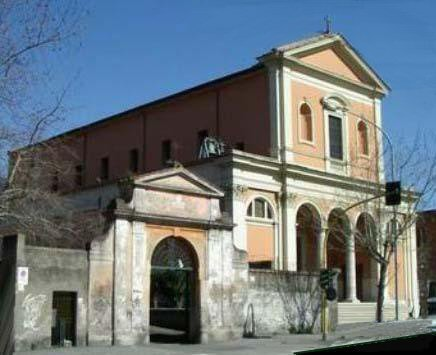
Chiesa San Marcellino e Pietro ad Duas Lauros

Santi Marcellino e Pietro ad Duas Lauros is a church in the Prenestino-Labicano quarter of Rome, Italy. Located on the ancient Via Labicana on land once owned by Helena, mother of Constantine, it was along the southern part of the Via Francigena.

== History ==
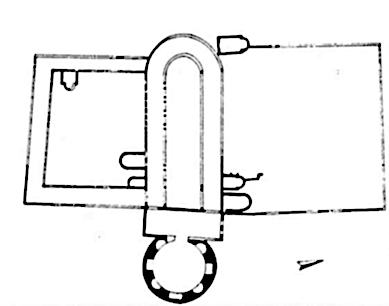
Plan of Constantine's basilica with mausoleum of Helena

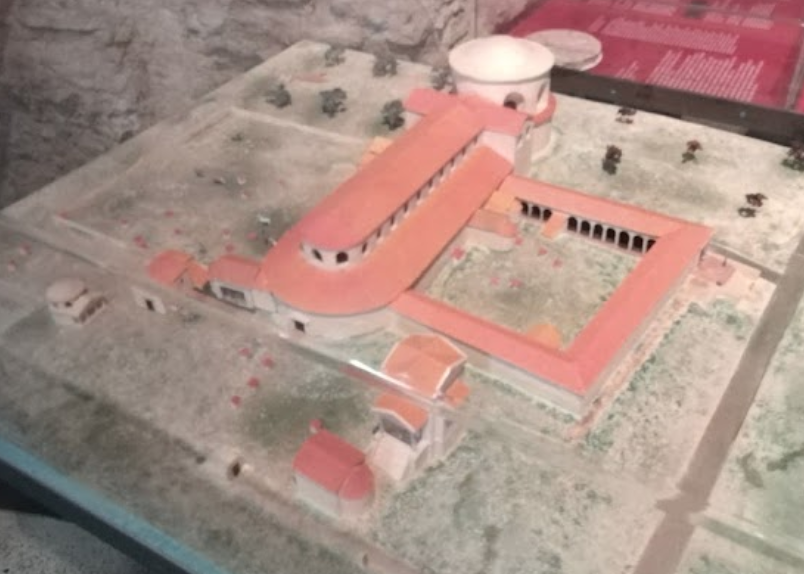
Model of basilica

The area known as Ad Duas Lauros ("to the two laurels") started from the third mile of the ancient Via Labicana and was probably imperial property and the site of the necropolis of the Imperial Horse Guards. Nearby, in the present Park of Centocelle, was the great Roman Villa "ad Duas Lauros" which was owned by Helena and known as the home of the Flavian Christians. She later donated the property to the Church. It dated from the Republican era to the 5th-6th century AD when it reached its maximum extent of almost two hectares and is said by some accounts to be the site of the assassination of the Emperor Valentinian III.

Around 320 Constantine I built a funerary basilica dedicated to saints Marcellinus and Peter over the Catacombs of Marcellinus and Peter. He followed this with the large circular Mausoleum of Helena built for his mother against its eastern facade between 326 and 330 in a similar plan to that of Santa Constanza for his daughter Constantina which was built later. The basilica was built with the apse facing the west. Its foundations were weakened by the catacombs below and the building fell into disrepair.

The catacombs were an important pilgrimage destination until the 9th century. In 1256, Pope Alexander IV had the martyrs' relics translated to the recently rebuilt Santi Marcellino e Pietro al Laterano at the intersection of Via Labicana with Via Merulana.

Partly reusing its ruins, between 1632 and 1638, under Pope Urban VIII, a small Baroque church was erected dedicated to the two saints was built inside the mausoleum, then enlarged in 1765 during the pontificate of Pope Clement XIII.

A new neo-Romanesque parish church was constructed closer to the Via Casilina in 1922. The small church was de-consecrated.

== Architecture ==
A three-arched portico is supported by two Corinthian columns. The simple façade has a balustraded window flanked by two niches and surmounted by a triangular tympanum.

The interior consists of a central nave of eight bays with side aisles; the first bay contains an internal entrance loggia and the last bay is a transept. The central nave is separated from the side aisles by arcades having five travertine limestone Doric columns on each side. The altarpiece is a painting of The Martyrdom of SS Marcellinus and Peter.

== See also ==
- Santi Marcellino e Pietro al Laterano
