= Mausoleum of Maxentius =

Tomb from the 4th century Rome, Italy

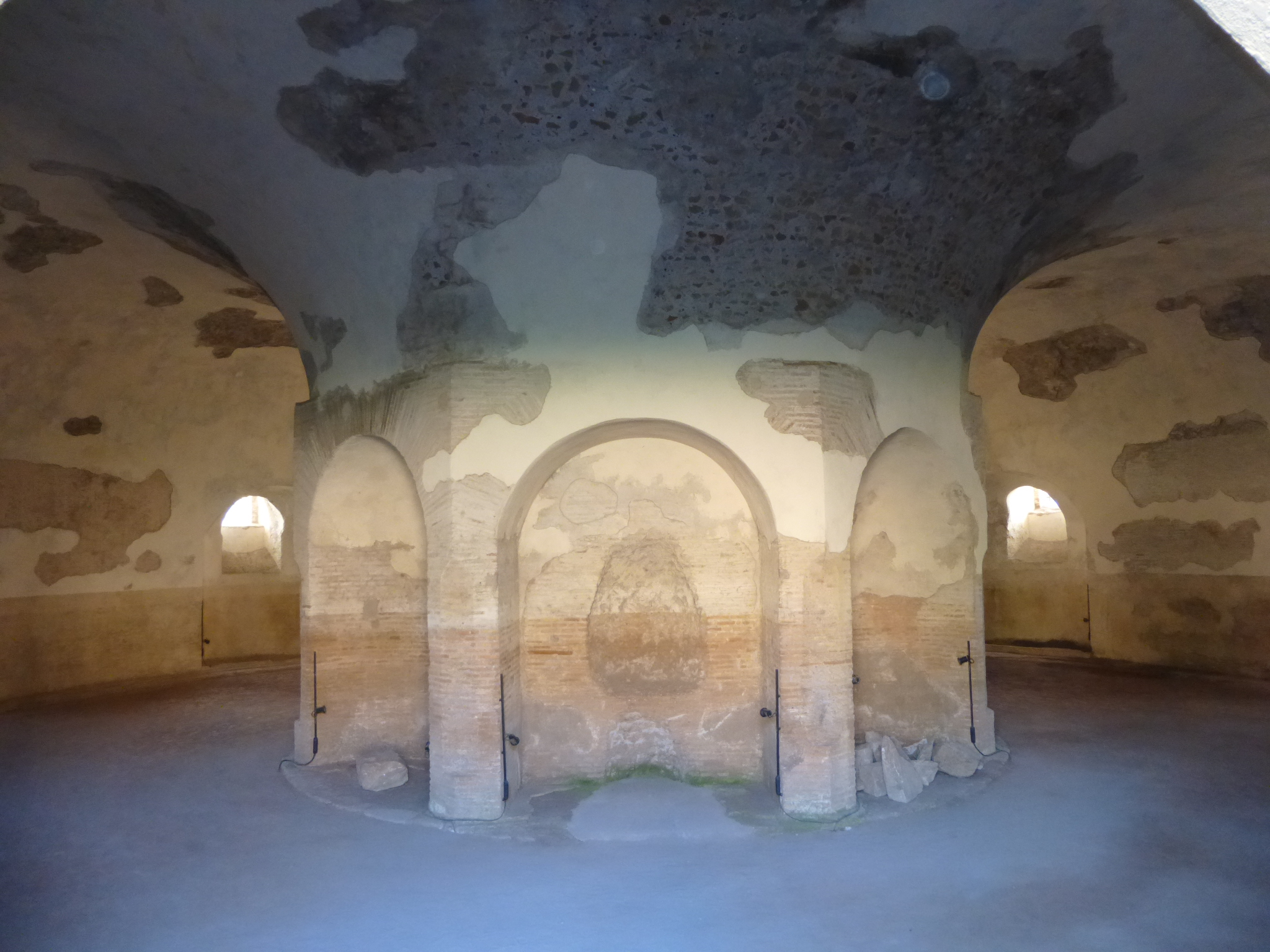
- An interior view of the mausoleum
- Interactive map of Mausoleum of Maxentius
- 41°51′19″N 12°31′07″E
- Type: Mausoleum
- Location: Regio IX Circus Flaminius

History
- Built: 28 BC
- Built by: Augustus

The Mausoleum of Maxentius was part of a large complex on the Appian Way in Rome that included a palace and a chariot racing circus, constructed by the Emperor Maxentius. The large circular tomb was built by Maxentius in the early 4th century, probably with himself in mind and as a family tomb. When his young son Valerius Romulus died, he was buried there. After extensive renovation the mausoleum was reopened to the public in 2014.

== History ==
Maxentius may have decided to build the mausoleum on the Appian Way because, according to Roman custom, all bodies had to be buried outside the city. The complex is very close to several catacombs. The mausoleum is believed to have been a two-story, cylindrical rotunda with a diameter of around 35 metres, but only its semi-underground floor survives. There is a central octagonal pillar with a diameter of more than nine metres and this is circled by a seven-metre-wide, vaulted corridor with open niches for the sarcophagi. There is no trace of floor or wall decoration, suggesting that the building was never completed.

An 18th-century home largely obscures the mausoleum from the Appian Way and stands where a columnar porch once framed the tomb's principal entrance. This was originally a farmhouse and was later converted into a home by the Torlonia family, who owned it until it was taken over by the Fascist government in 1943.

== See also ==
- List of ancient monuments in Rome

Preceded by Mausoleum of Helena	Landmarks of Rome; Mausoleum of Maxentius	Succeeded by Pyramid of Cestius
