= Mausoleum of Helena =

Ancient Roman building on the Via Casilina

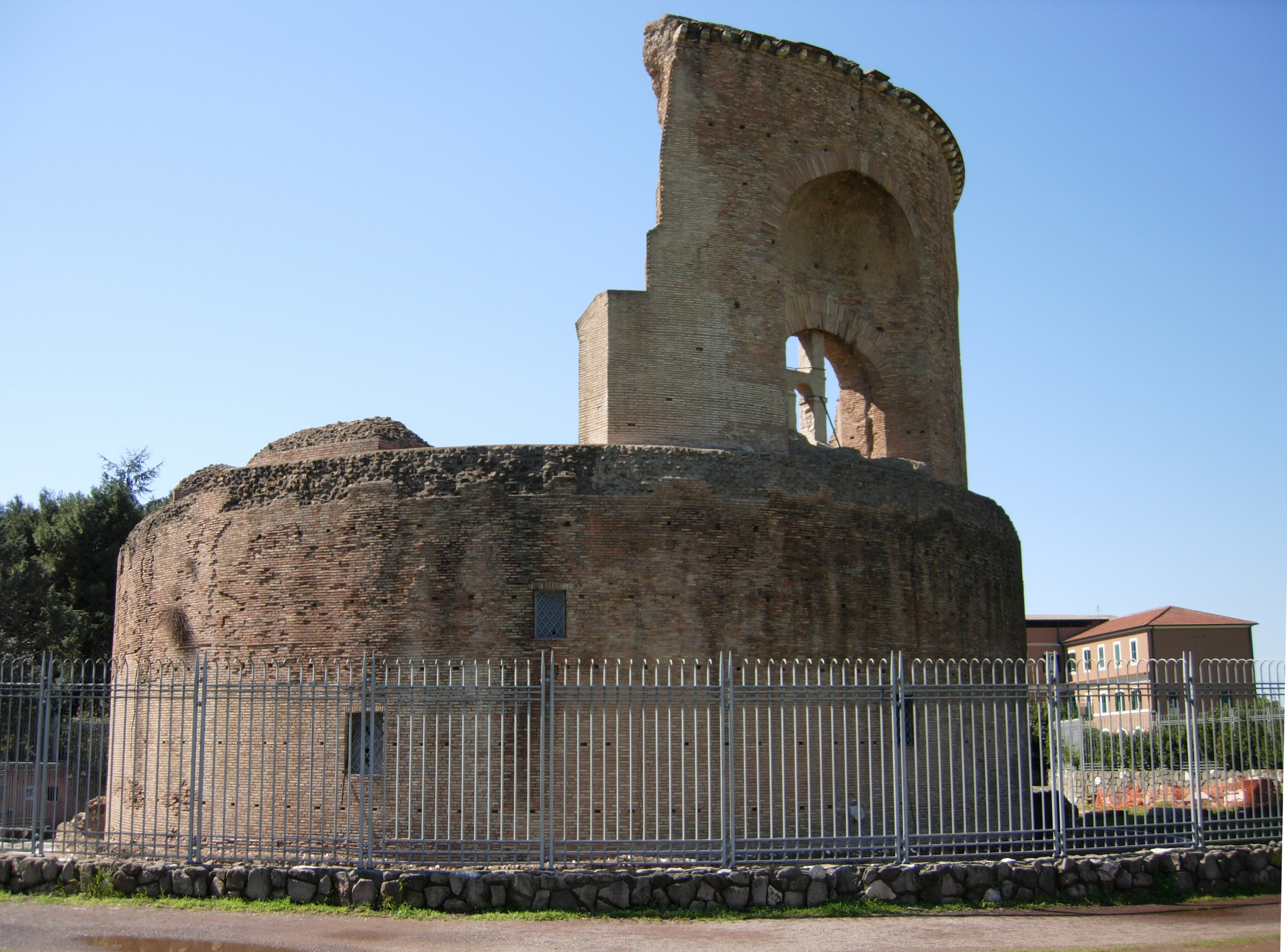
- The Mausoleum of Helena
- Interactive map of Mausoleum of Helena
- 41°52′44″N 12°32′56″E
- Type: Mausoleum
- Location: Regio IX Circus Flaminius

History
- Built: 28 BC
- Built by: Augustus

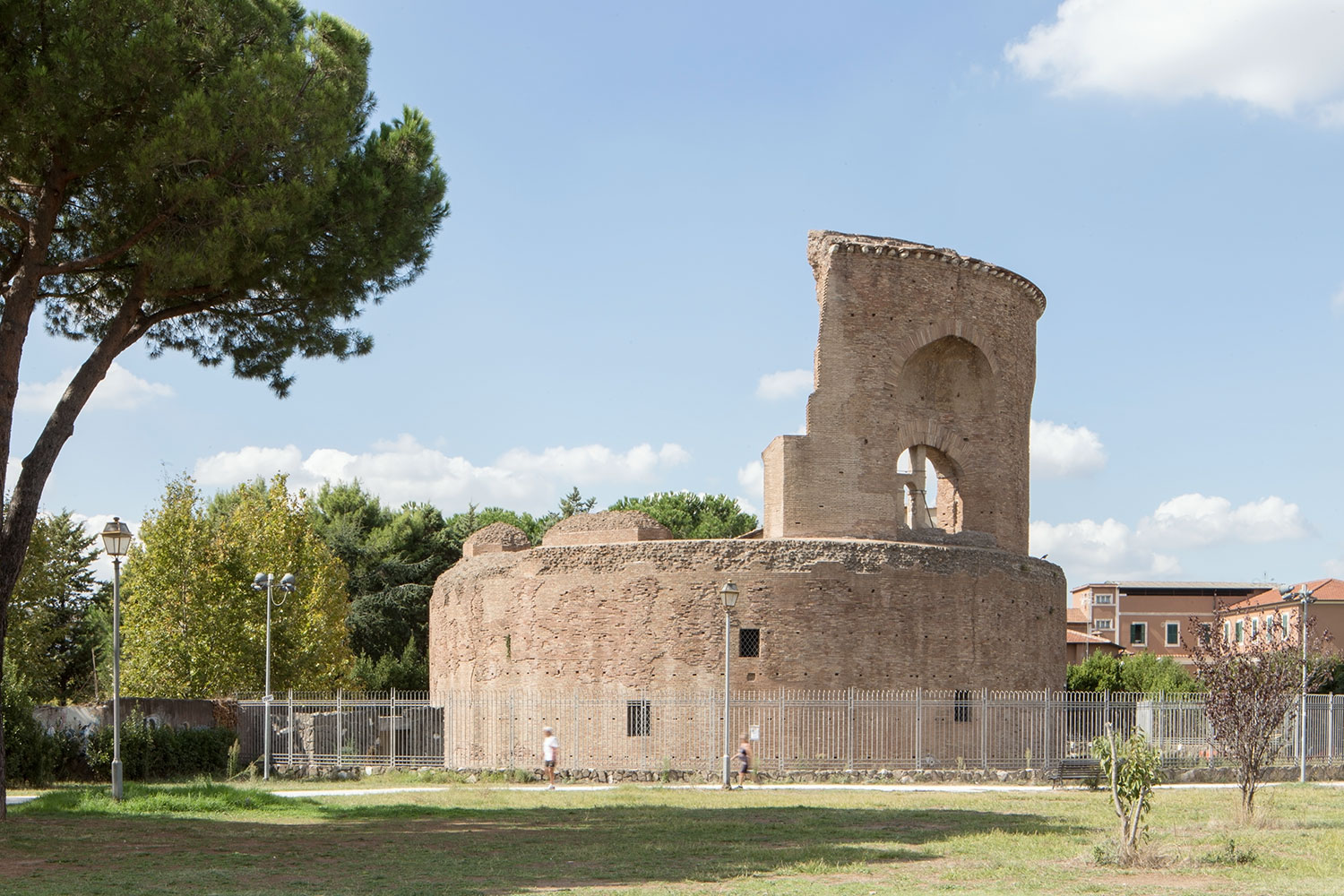
Mausoleum

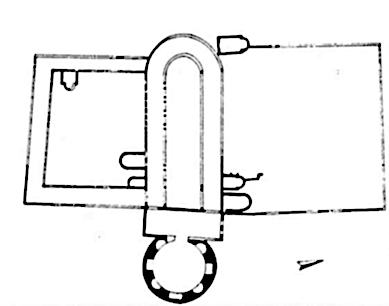
Plan of Constantine's basilica with mausoleum of Helena

The Mausoleum of Helena is an ancient building in Rome, Italy, located on the Via Casilina, corresponding to the 3rd mile of the ancient Via Labicana. It was built by the Roman emperor Constantine I between 326 and 330, originally as a tomb for himself, as indicated by his sarcophagus found there, but later assigned to his mother Helena who died in 330.

Access to the mausoleum and the catacombs is to the west of the church of Santi Marcellino e Pietro ad Duas Lauros.

== History ==
The area where the mausoleum is located was known as Ad Duas Lauros, was probably imperial property and used as a cemetery of the Equites singulares. This has been attested by numerous inscriptions mentioning the Equites at Ad Duas Lauros, although the exact location of the necropolis has not been discovered. It has been supposed that the necropolis was deliberately destroyed by Constantine as revenge against the Equites who, in the battle of the Milvian Bridge, sided with Maxentius against him. Nearby, in the present Park of Centocelle, was the great Roman Villa "ad Duas Lauros" which was later owned by Helena and known as the home of the Flavian Christians. She later donated the property to the Church. It dated from the Republican era to the 5th-6th century AD when it reached its maximum extent of almost two hectares and was the place of death of Valentinian III. The Catacombs of Marcellinus and Peter were established here and Constantine built a basilica for the same martyrs near their tombs.

The mausoleum was built from 326 next to the basilica in a similar complex to that of Santa Constanza and after the death of Helena in 330, the tomb was assigned to her.

The mausoleum was later damaged by the use of its materials for other constructions. In the 8th century it became a defensive fortress. However, it continued to house Helena's tomb until the 11th century, when the sarcophagus was brought to the Lateran (currently it is in the Vatican Museum).

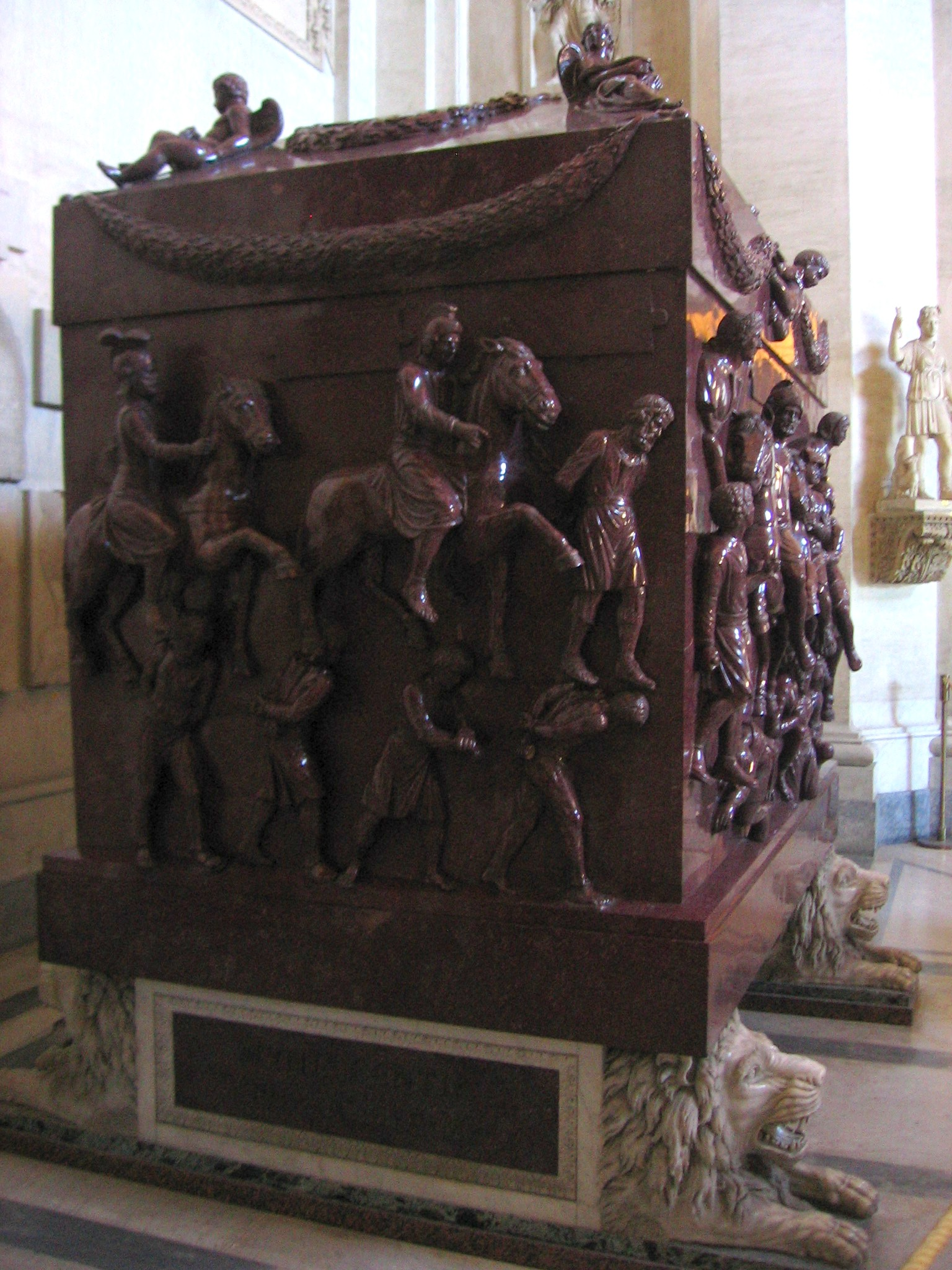
The Sarcophagus of Helena

Lanzoni and Duchesne place in this area the town known as Subaugusta, whose name referred to the Augusta Helena, and which for a while formed a small diocese, four of whose bishops took part in synods held at Rome between 465 and 502. The see is included in the Catholic Church's list of titular sees.

== Architecture ==
The building has a circular plan and is constituted by two cylinders, the upper one being of smaller diameter (27.7 metres (91 ft), internal diameter 20.2 metres (66 ft)). The original height was 25.4 metres (83 ft), while today it has reduced to some 18 metres (59 ft).

Internally, the lower cylinder has an octagonal shape. At the vertices are niches, alternatively rectangular and semicircular; one of them housed the entrance. In correspondence with the niches, in the upper ring, were eight arcaded windows. In order to lighten the dome, it included large amphorae (as in the Temple of Romulus or the Mausoleum of Villa Gordiani), which are now visible after the vault has collapsed. This led to the medieval name of the mausoleum, Torpignattara (Torre delle pignatte, meaning "Tower of the Vases"), today also used for the quarter which has grown around.

The rectangular niche facing the entrance most likely contained the sarcophagus of Helena, in red porphyry. The external faces of the sarcophagus are decorated with war scenes as it was probably originally to be used for emperor Constantine.

== See also ==
- Sarcophagi of Helena and Constantina
- Catacombs of Marcellinus and Peter
- Santi Marcellino e Pietro ad Duas Lauros
- List of ancient monuments in Rome

Preceded by Mausoleum of Augustus	Landmarks of Rome; Mausoleum of Helena	Succeeded by Mausoleum of Maxentius
