= Mausoleum of Constantina =

Santa Costanza
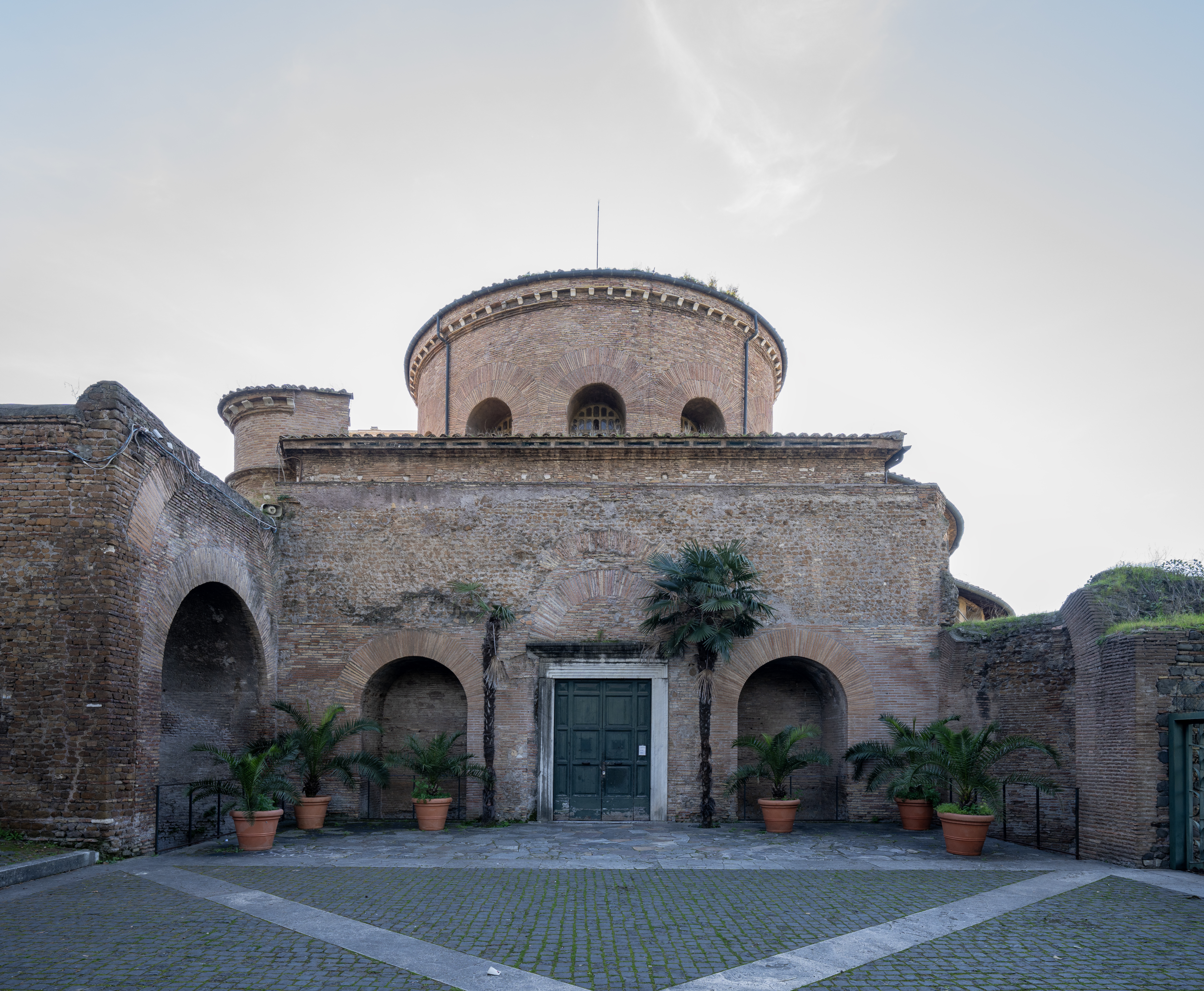
- View of the mausoleum of Santa Costanza.
- Click on the map for a fullscreen view.
- 41°55′21″N 12°31′03″E
- Location: Via Nomentana, Rome
- Country: Italy
- Denomination: Catholic Church

Architecture
- Architectural type: Church
- Style: Early Christian art and architecture
- Groundbreaking: 4th century

Administration
- Archdiocese: Diocese of Rome

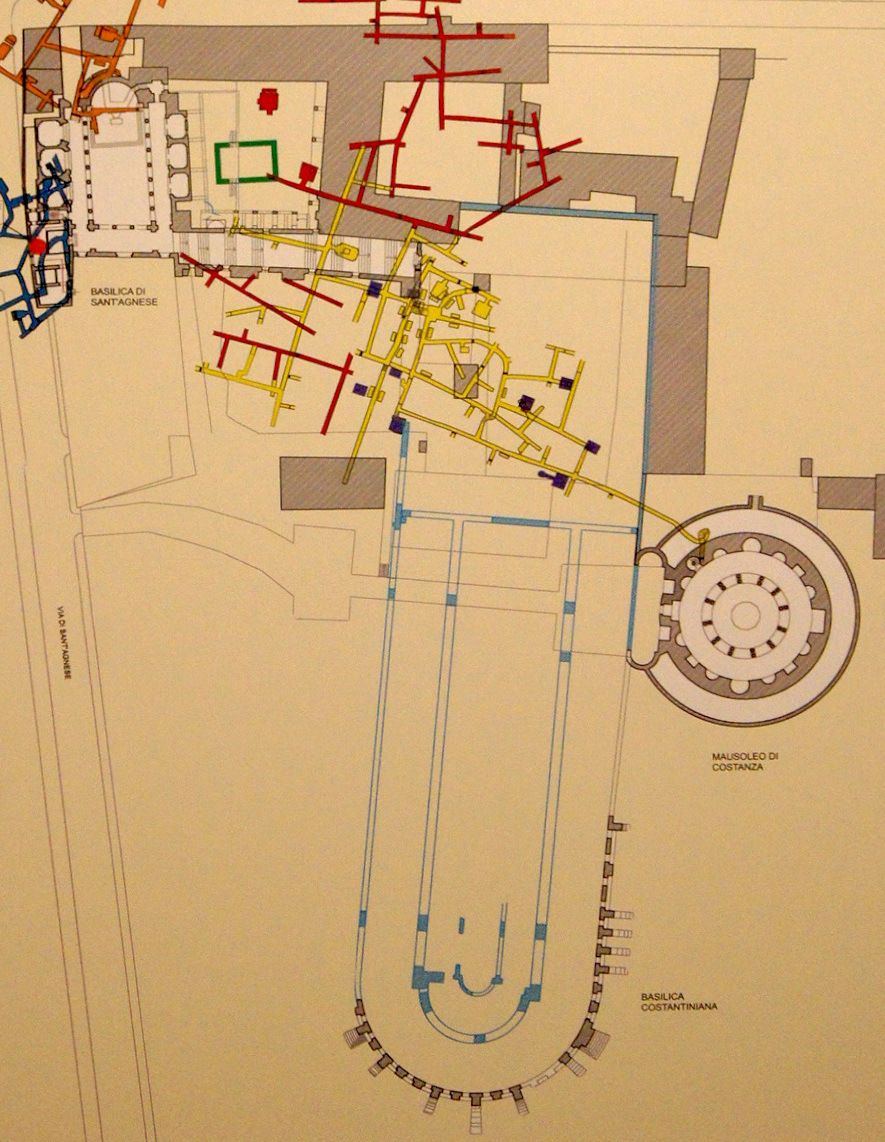
Plan of Mausoleum with basilica, Church of Sant'Agnes and catacombs

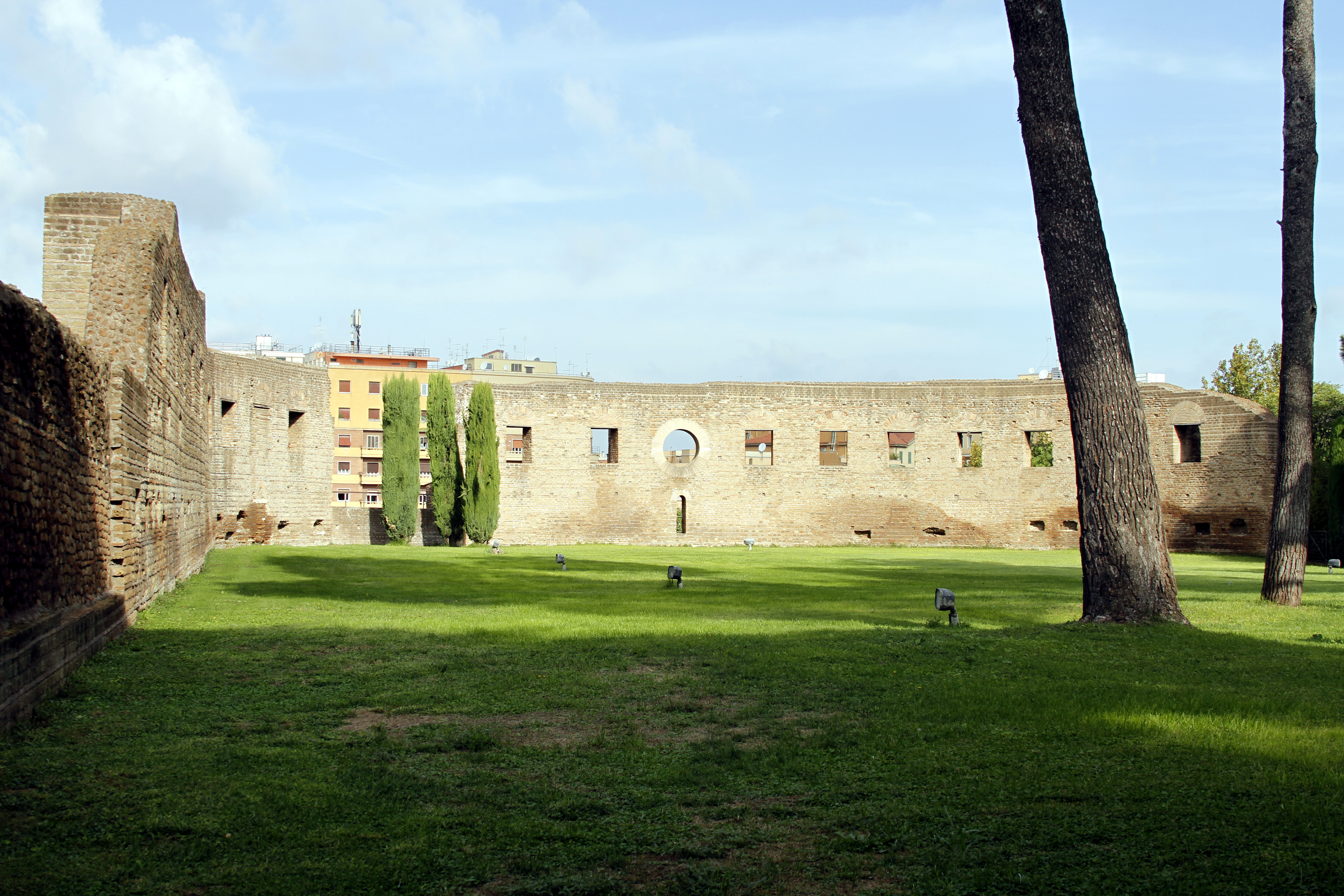
View into the basilica from in front of Santa Costanza

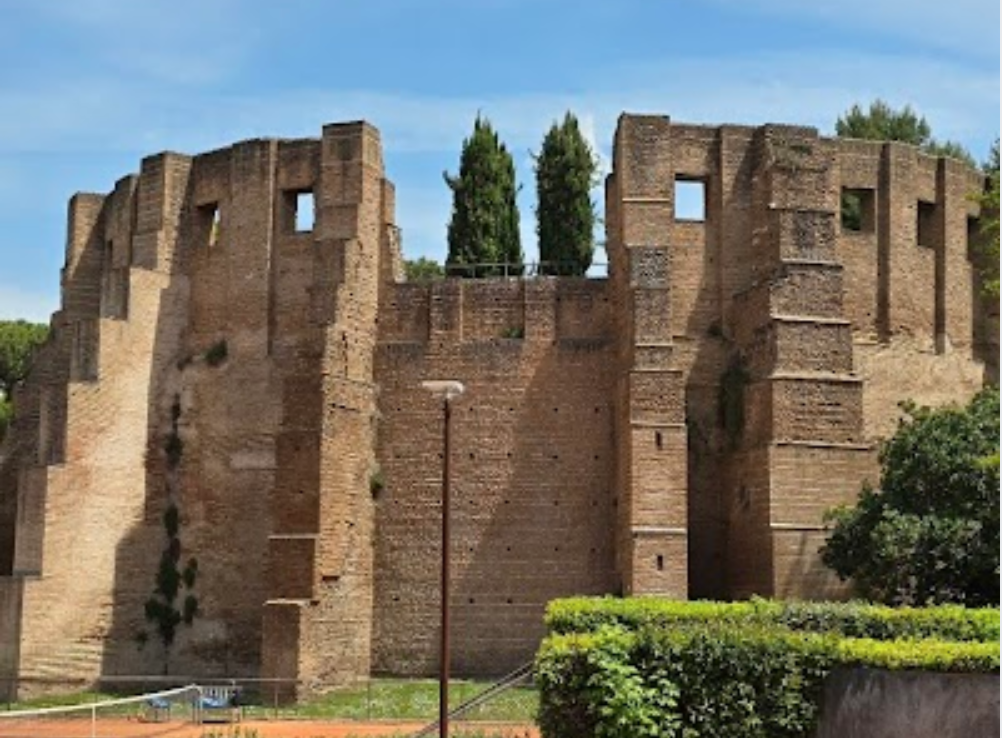
Exterior of Constantinian basilica

The Mausoleum of Constantina, also known as the Mausoleum of Santa Costanza, was built in the 4th century AD for Constantina (also known as Constantia), the daughter of the emperor Constantine I. It later became a church. It is located in Rome on the Via Nomentana, within the monumental complex of Sant'Agnese fuori le mura.

It is one of the best preserved buildings from Late Antiquity left in Rome and includes original ceiling mosaics. It was adjacent to the earlier basilica, now in ruins, built by Constantine I from 338 as a funerary hall. It was also built over part of the earlier Catacombs of Saint Agnes in which the martyr Saint Agnes is believed to be buried and over whose tomb was a small chapel nearby.

According to the traditional view, the mausoleum was built in the reign of Constantine I for his daughter Constantina, later also known as Constantia or Costanza, who died in 354. Ultimately, Constantina's sarcophagus was housed here, but it may have been moved from an earlier location.

The mausoleum is of circular plan with an ambulatory surrounding a central dome and survives in essentially its original form. Despite the loss of the coloured stone veneers of the walls, some damage to the mosaics and incorrect restoration, the building stands in excellent condition as a prime example of Early Christian art and architecture. The vaults of the apses and ambulatory display well preserved examples of Late Roman mosaics. A key component which is missing from the decorative scheme is the mosaic of the central dome. In the sixteenth century, watercolours were made of this central dome so the pictorial scheme can be hypothetically reconstructed. The large porphyry sarcophagus of either Constantina or her sister Helena has survived intact, and is now in the Vatican Museum – an object of great significance to the study of the art of Late Antiquity.

== Location ==
Santa Costanza is located a minute's walk to the side of the Via Nomentana, the road that follows the ancient Roman route running north-east from Rome to Nomentum or Mentana. It lay a short way outside the ancient walls of Rome in a cemetery area, and probably in an Imperial family estate. The underground catacombs had been built there many years earlier and contained the relics of Saint Agnes who was martyred as a thirteen-year-old, and over whose tomb was a small chapel.

== History ==
The funerary hall or "Constantinian basilica" was built first from 338 as a result of Constantina's devotion to Saint Agnes, a legend later considerably elaborated, but early Christians believed that their souls benefited from being buried close to martyrs, which was almost certainly a major attraction of the funerary hall to those who paid to be buried in it.

The mausoleum was built around 350, as shown by excavations in 1992 which discovered an earlier building beneath which may have been the baptistry built by Constantine (at the same time as the funerary hall), in which Constantina and her paternal aunt were baptised by Pope Silvester I (d. 335), as recorded in Liber Pontificalis.

Annexing an important mausoleum to a basilica was a common practice at the time, as seen in the Mausoleum of Helena (Constantine's mother) attached to the basilica of Santi Marcellino e Pietro ad Duas Lauros on Via Labicana (today Via Casilina). Other basilicas with floorplans typical of the Constantine era are San Sebastiano fuori le mura on Via Appia, San Lorenzo fuori le mura on Via Tiburtina and the anonymous basilicas on Via Prenestina and Via Ardeatina, the latter recently discovered and attributed as the burial place of Pope Mark (d.336).

The bodies of the sisters were both brought considerable distances to be buried there: Ammianus records that Constantina's body was brought back from Bithynia, and Helena's from Gaul.

The Constantinian basilica gradually fell out of use and into ruins, with the base of the wall now surviving for about a third of the original circuit of exterior walls, but Santa Costanza has survived all but intact. It is documented that Pope Nicholas I celebrated mass there in 865, the first time that "Santa Costanza" is recorded as its name, but its consecration as a church was not until 1254, by Pope Alexander IV, who had what were believed to be the remains of Constantia removed from the larger sarcophagus and placed under a central altar.

== Architecture ==
=== Purpose ===
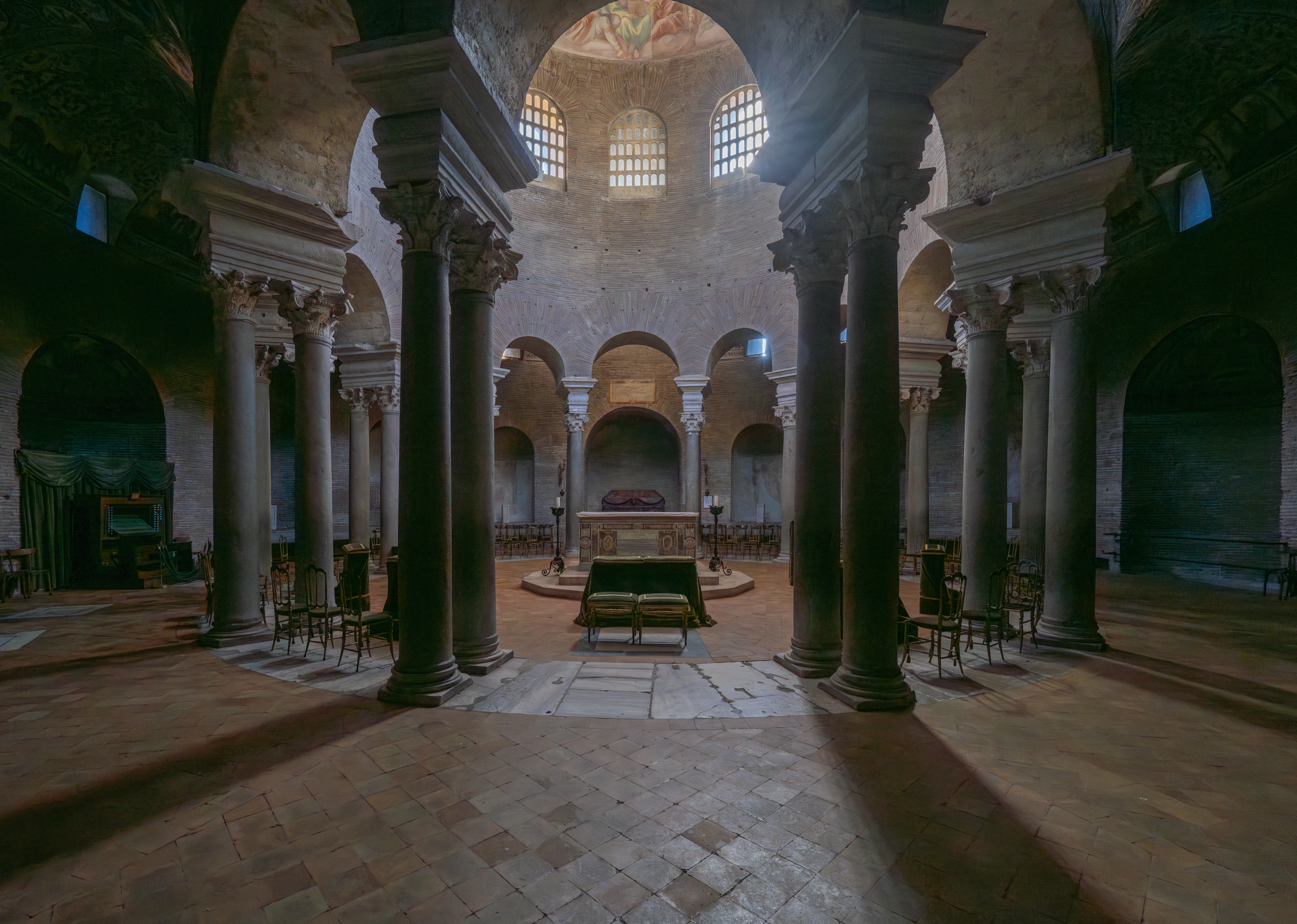
Interior view.

The structure of Santa Costanza reflects its original function as the mausoleum of one or both Constantine's two daughters, Constantia and Helena, rather than as the church it became much later. The centralized design put "direct physical emphasis on the person or place to be honored" and was popular for mausoleums and places of baptisms at this time. Other early Christian buildings with a similar origin and a circular plan include Split Cathedral, built within Diocletian's Palace as his mausoleum, and the Rotunda of Galerius (now the Church of St. George) in Thessaloniki built as a mausoleum for Galerius.

=== Structure ===
Santa Costanza is a circular, centralized structure, with a circular ambulatory ringing a high central space topped by a shallow dome, which is raised on a round drum, as can be seen from the exterior. It is built of brick-faced concrete and its structure is basically two rings supported by columns placed around a vertical central axis. The upper ring sits on the columns while the "lower ring encloses a circular ambulatory whose space flows between the columns into the axial cylinder." This design essentially creates two spaces or two worlds, that of the ambulatory and that of the upper dome. The screens of the ambulatory and inner ring create a dark contrast to the bright upper space of the dome. This contrast of light can be seen in the picture of the main interior. The single door, flanked by two arched niches, would originally have been an internal arch or doorway leading straight into the Constaninian basilica or funerary hall, half-way along its length. There is a short vestibule inside the door, opening to the ambulatory.

An arched arcade with twelve pairs of granite columns decorated with composite capitals supports the drum below the dome, and separates the area of the ambulatory beyond, which is much darker, as light from twelve windows in the clerestory does not reach this area as well. In contrast, the central area is well-lit, creating interplay between dark and light in the interior.

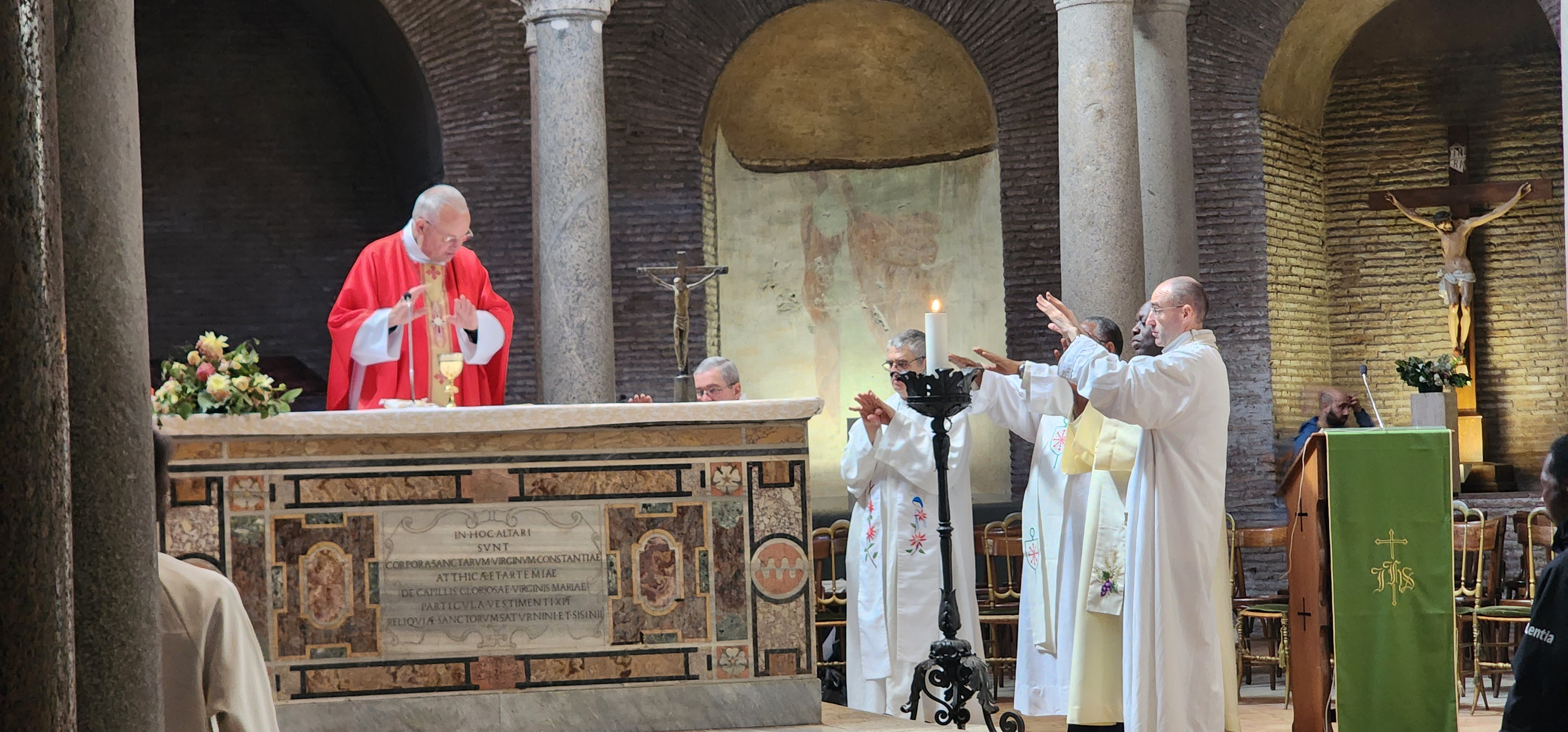
A French-language service in the Jubilee Year of 2025.

The number of arches, pairs of columns and windows could be a reference to the Twelve Apostles. Opposite the entrance in this central space there is "a kind of baldacchino...rises above a porphyry plaque which, below the middle arch of the center room, once seems to have carried the princess's sarcophagus". This is where the sarcophagus of Constantina, or perhaps the second one, would have rested. The ambulatory is barrel-vaulted and is 22.5 meters or 74 feet in diameter. The ambulatory has most of the surviving mosaics in the church. Larger arches mark the cardinal points in the mausoleum. The walls were probably covered in slabs of colourful marble, as was usual in imperial buildings. Santa Costanza was also to some extent a new type of building. It was different from earlier styles in that the roof, which would previously have been typically flat and made with wood, was instead designed as a dome and vault.

=== Decoration ===
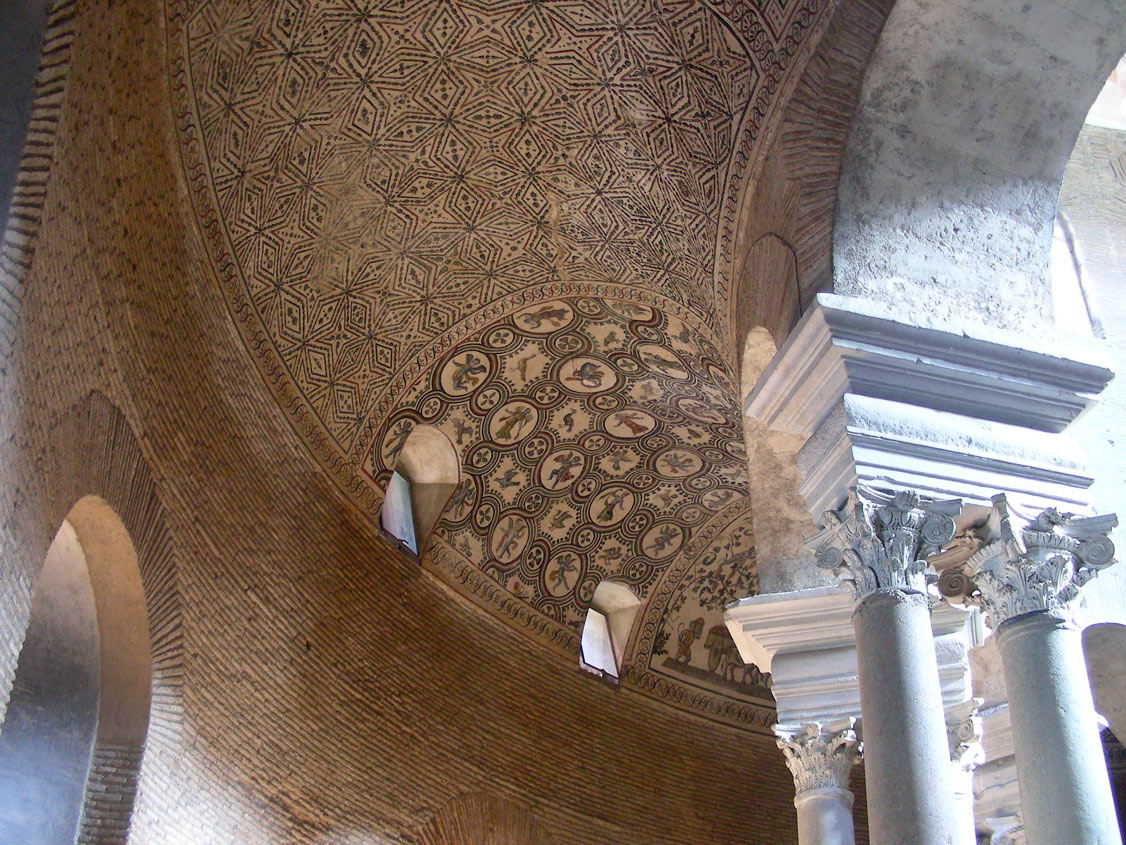
The fourth-century mosaics of the ambulatory vault and the paired columns

==== Mosaics ====
The mosaics of Santa Costanza are important examples of Early Christian art and secular palace ceiling mosaics. The apses, central dome, and ambulatory all had mosaic decoration.

As evidenced by surviving Renaissance-era illustrations the church was likely once covered with mosaic decoration but today all that remains are those in the two apses and those in the ring barrel vault. In particular, the ring vault mosaics are well preserved and consist of eleven divisions of ornamental motifs, some of which are repeated. The mosaics here were composed using pieces of marble unlike the composition using glass cubes that would become popular in later works. The use of color is significant as the mosaics encompass a narrow range of colors including dark green, brown, red and yellow on a relatively plain light backdrop. This color scheme is comparable to earlier Roman mosaic compositions of the first half of the fourth century and dates these compositions to very soon after the completion of the structure as opposed to being later additions.

==== Mosaics in the apses ====
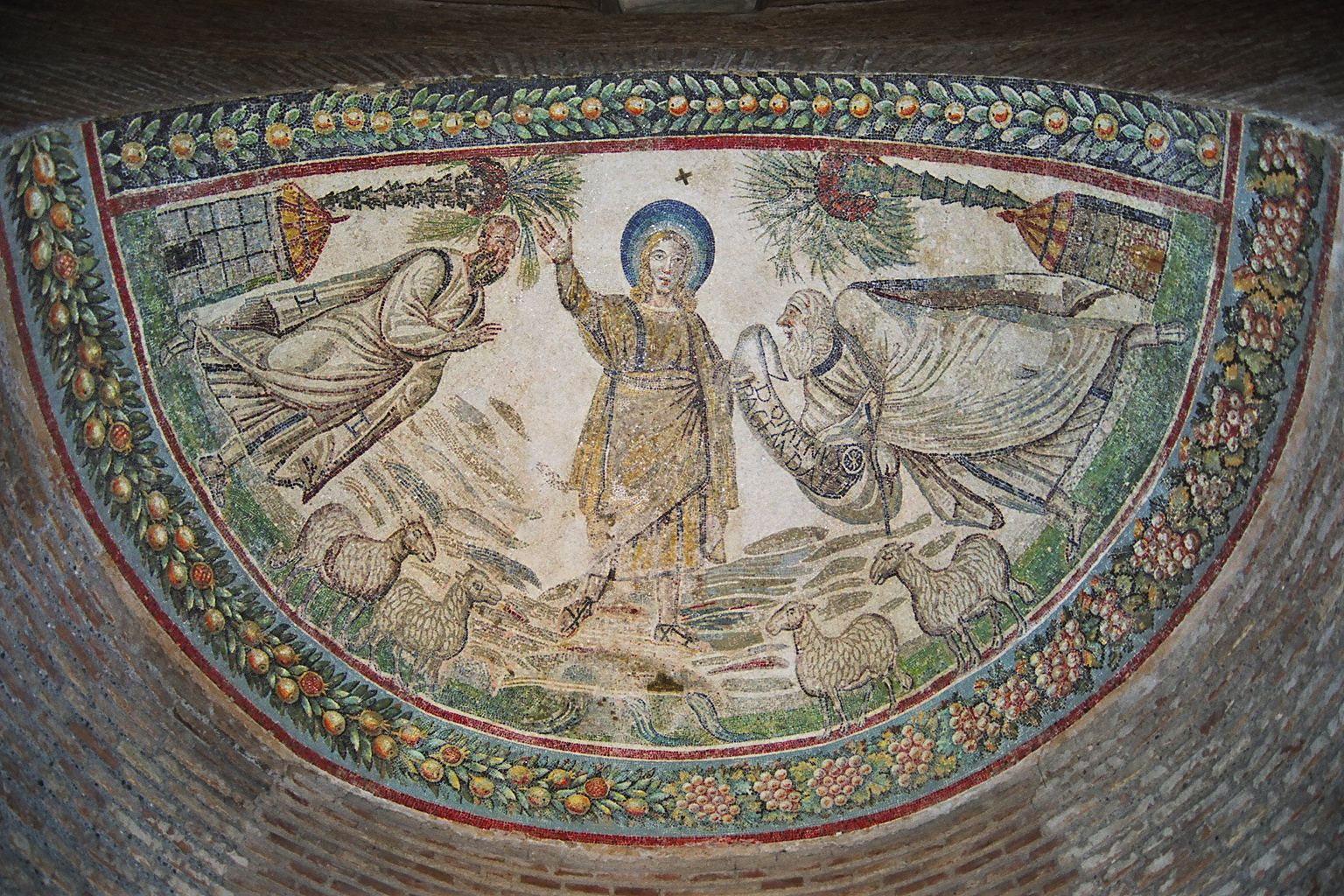
Mosaic with the Traditio Legis

In the ambulatory wall there are two shallow apses, each with a mosaic showing Christ as the Pantocrator, the earliest surviving examples of this depiction; they probably date to the 5th or 7th century, though there has been much discussion of this. Like many mosaics of the period, both have suffered from restoration and both show elements of Roman imperial imagery, representing early examples of the conflation of this with Christian art. A mosaic with two women wearing white, reported as being behind the sarcophagus in the Renaissance, has now gone and was never drawn.

One of the apses shows a traditio legis: Christ is shown with Saints Peter and Paul giving Peter the scroll representing law, with the inscription, "DOMINUS PACEM DAT," or "The Lord is giving Peace." A few sheep represent his role as shepherd governing and leading his flock. Christ is clothed in golden robes, suggesting his power and supremacy. He is shown rising above paradise, which further shows his dominance over both heaven and earth.

==== Mosaics in the ambulatory ====
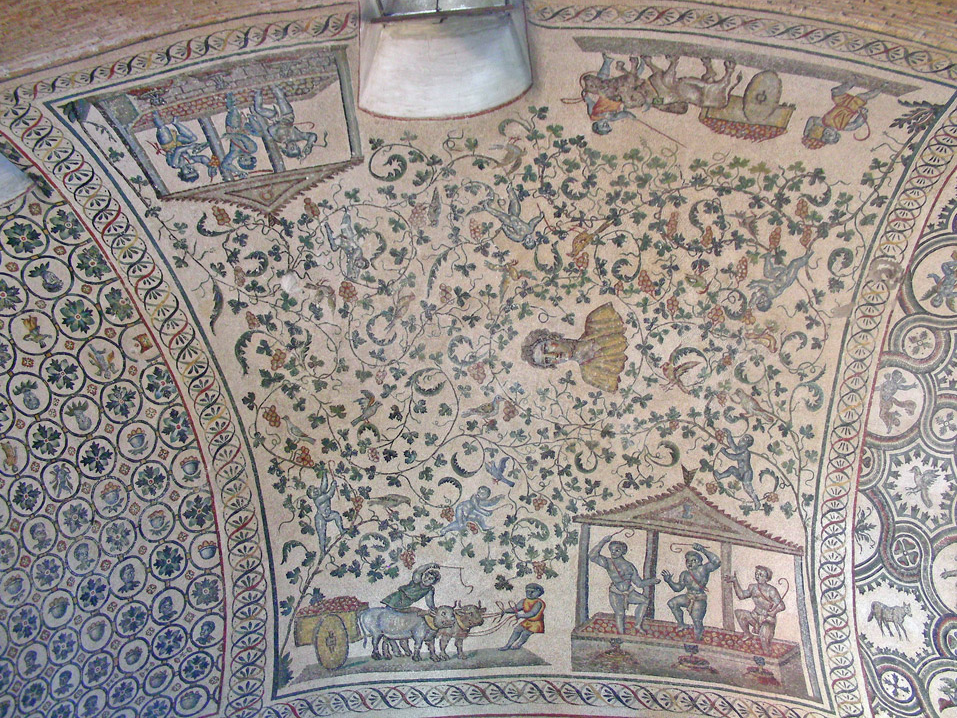
Mosaic in the ambulatory.

The 4th-century mosaics on the ambulatory vault are contemporary with the building, and show a stark contrast to those in the apses, being essentially secular in appearance and make no obvious Christian allusions. The surface of area of many of these mosaic panels is occupied by a profusion of vine and plant ornament as well as containing geometric patterns, small heads or figures within compartmented frames, birds with branches of foliage, vases and other objects. The fifth and eighth panels depict circles with alternating floral and figurative designs and panel six displays representations of boughs and greenery accompanied by birds and vessels. These naturalistic ornaments suggest to the viewer ideas of beauty and abundance and reflect the decorations found in Early Christian catacombs, suggesting a theme of the promise of beauty and abundance to be found in Heaven following a Christian death.

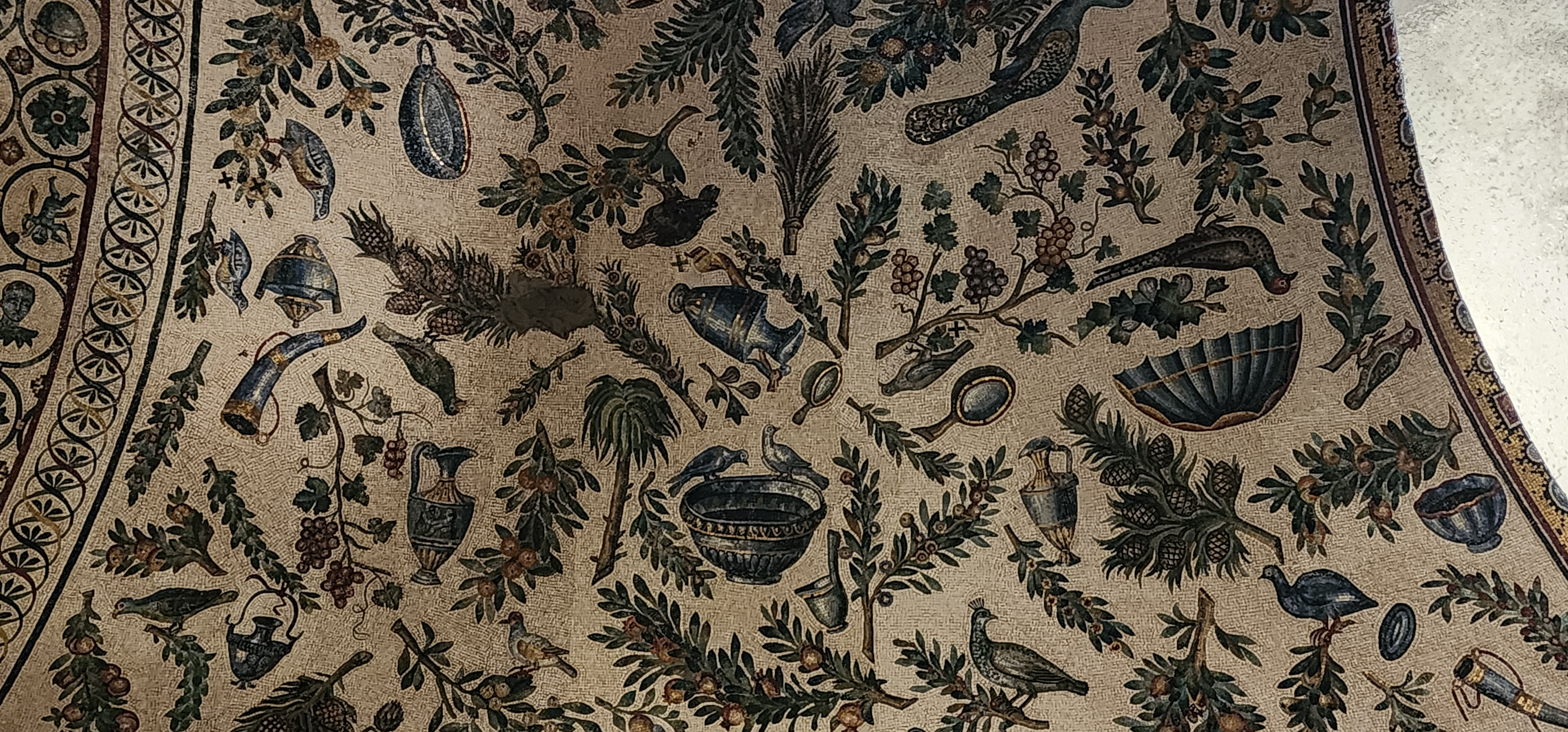
Fourth-century mosaic.

Significantly one particular panel is especially pagan in character and depicts grapevine scrolls accompanied by cupids picking grapes and crafting them into wine, a depiction that seems to recall Bacchus, the Roman god of wine. It was because of the predominance of this imagery that during the Renaissance period the building came to be known as the “Tempio di Bacco” and believed to have a pagan origin. This type of scene also appears on Constantina's sarcophagus, as it does on the ends of the Sarcophagus of Junius Bassus. The pagan appearance of such images of grapes, fruit, birds, and mythological figures represent the period of transition between paganism to Christianity that was taking place in Rome at this time. Bacchic motifs were often used in the funerary monuments of late antiquity and although a decided religious shift was taking place in Rome it would be logical that some traditional imagery would persist and be adopted by the new tradition. The theme continues in the floor mosaics which were similar in style to those in the ambulatory, filled with cupids, birds, and Bacchus and grapevines. This may reflect the merging of pagan and Christian values in Rome, or alternatively construction under the non-Christian Julian. These mosaics probably represent the sort of decoration found in the Imperial palaces of the period, and in general have needed little restoration.

==== Central dome ====
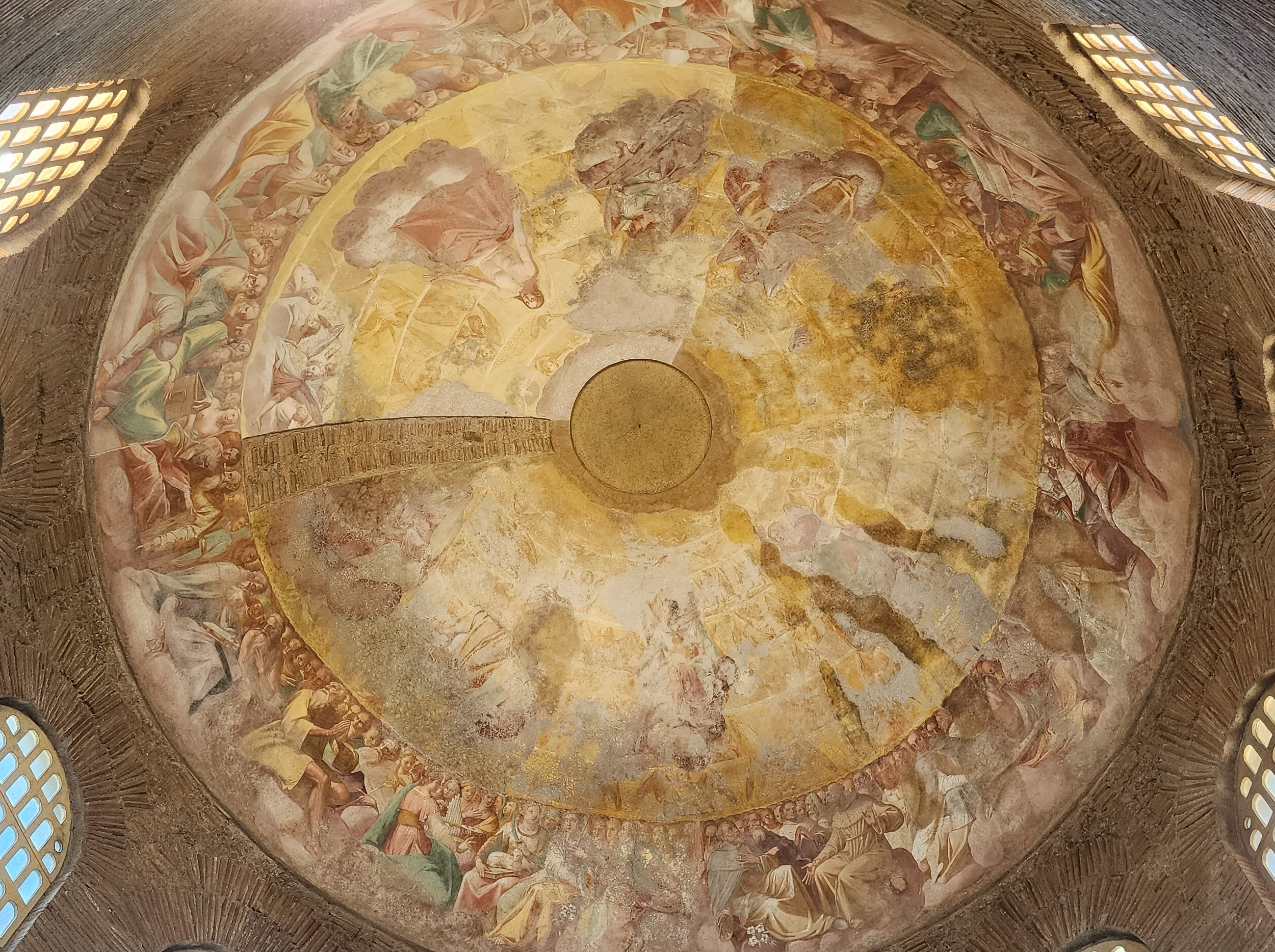
The present dome paintings.

The mosaics of the central dome no longer exist, but a picture of them can still be reconstructed as between 1538 and 1540 Francisco de Holanda made watercolour copies of what then survived. In these several biblical scenes appear, resembling catacomb paintings from the 3rd century, including Susanna and the Elders, Tobias, the sacrifice of Cain and Abel, the sacrifice of Elias on Mount Carmel, possibly Lot receiving the angels, Moses striking the rock for water, and possibly even Noah building the ark. The upper row of mosaics, largely missing by the 16th century, is thought to have had scenes from the New Testament since it has the Miracle of the Centurion. These mosaics have caryatids and acanthus-scrolls and a calendar of saints in the upper row. This, in conjunction with the two apses is where the majority of Christian imagery occurs.

=== Sarcophagi ===
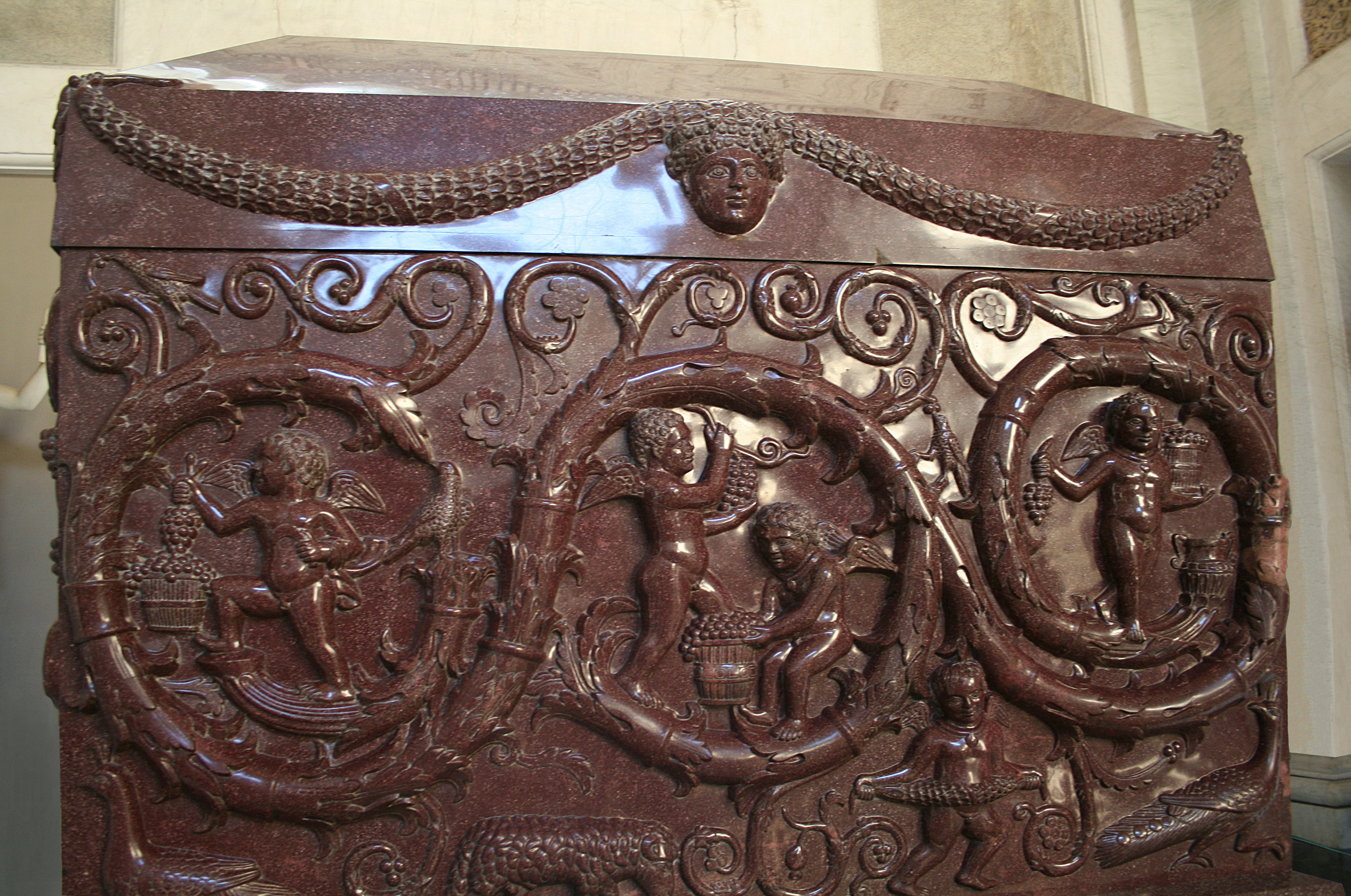
Sarcophagus of Constantina, Vatican Museums, originally stood in the mausoleum. A replica has been placed there.

Two magnificent large porphyry sarcophagi from the church are now in the Vatican; the larger and more famous (illustrated) in the Vatican Museums, where it was moved during the late 18th century and is on display. The smaller was moved in St Peter's itself (left transept) in 1606. It is now thought that the larger sarcophagus traditionally related to Constantina may in fact have housed her sister Helena, and the less spectacular one, also removed to the Vatican, was actually Constantina's.

Constantina's sarcophagus has complex symbolic designs in relief: "the surface is dominated by an intricate pattern of stylized vine-stems into which are fitted cherubs...with this scene of Dionysiac exuberance, and the hope of future blessedness which it implies, two peacocks, birds of immortality, are completely in accord". The scene presents an image of nature and plenty complete with grape vines, sheep and birds. The putti are framed in acanthus scrolls, above which there are several images of masks. Aside from the natural scene, there are also four portraits including Constantia herself, "on the lid, four graceful portrait heads, one apparently that of Constantina, look calmly out over this assurance that the best is yet to be". The imagery presented of wine and nature are not inherently Christian but could be perceived as such considering the use of wine in the Eucharist. Or they could be perceived as a connection to Bacchus, the God of Wine. This style of sarcophagus would cease to be used in Rome by the end of the fourth century, and this sarcophagus of Constantia is a prime example of the style.

The sarcophagus is massive with the chest measuring 128 cm or 4 ft 2 3/8 in high, 233 cm or 7 ft 7 1/2 in long, and 157 cm or 5 ft 1 3/4 in wide. It is made of porphyry, a hard purple stone, reserved by the Romans for use only by the imperial family, whose colour purple was. It was quarried from only one place, Mons Porphyriticus (Coptos, Egypt), making it even more exclusive. It appears, but can not be certain, that the sarcophagus of Constantina is a copy of that of Constantine I, her father, which is now lost. A piece of what is believed to be his sarcophagus is similar in style and of the same material. A cast replica has been placed in the church, though in the ambulatory; presumably its original position was in the centre of the church, now occupied by the altar. There is another in the Museum of Roman Civilization in the city.

== Alternative views ==
Some consider that the building was only later reassigned as a church dedicated to Santa Costanza. The veneration of Constantina as "Santa Costanza" (Saint Constance) is only known from the 16th century onward, and her name is not included in the Roman Martyrology. An original structure might be located underneath the current church, as a possibly triconch-shaped structure was partially excavated in 1987 and 1992 and computer-reconstructed by David J. Stanley.

That could suggest that the current church is the second Christian building on the site, and may be some decades later than traditionally thought, being built as a mausoleum for Constantina's sister Helena in the reign of her husband Julian the Apostate. (This would be odd, however, because Julian was a staunch pagan.) If true, the larger of the two porphyry sarcophagi there would belong to Helena, and the smaller to Constantina, the opposite of what has been traditionally thought. The earlier triconch building of the 330s was probably indeed built for Constantina, but she later had to take second place to her sister. Then, as Constantina's fame as a saintly figure developed in the Middle Ages, their roles became reversed in the popular mind.
