= Villa Gordiani =

Park in Rome, Italy

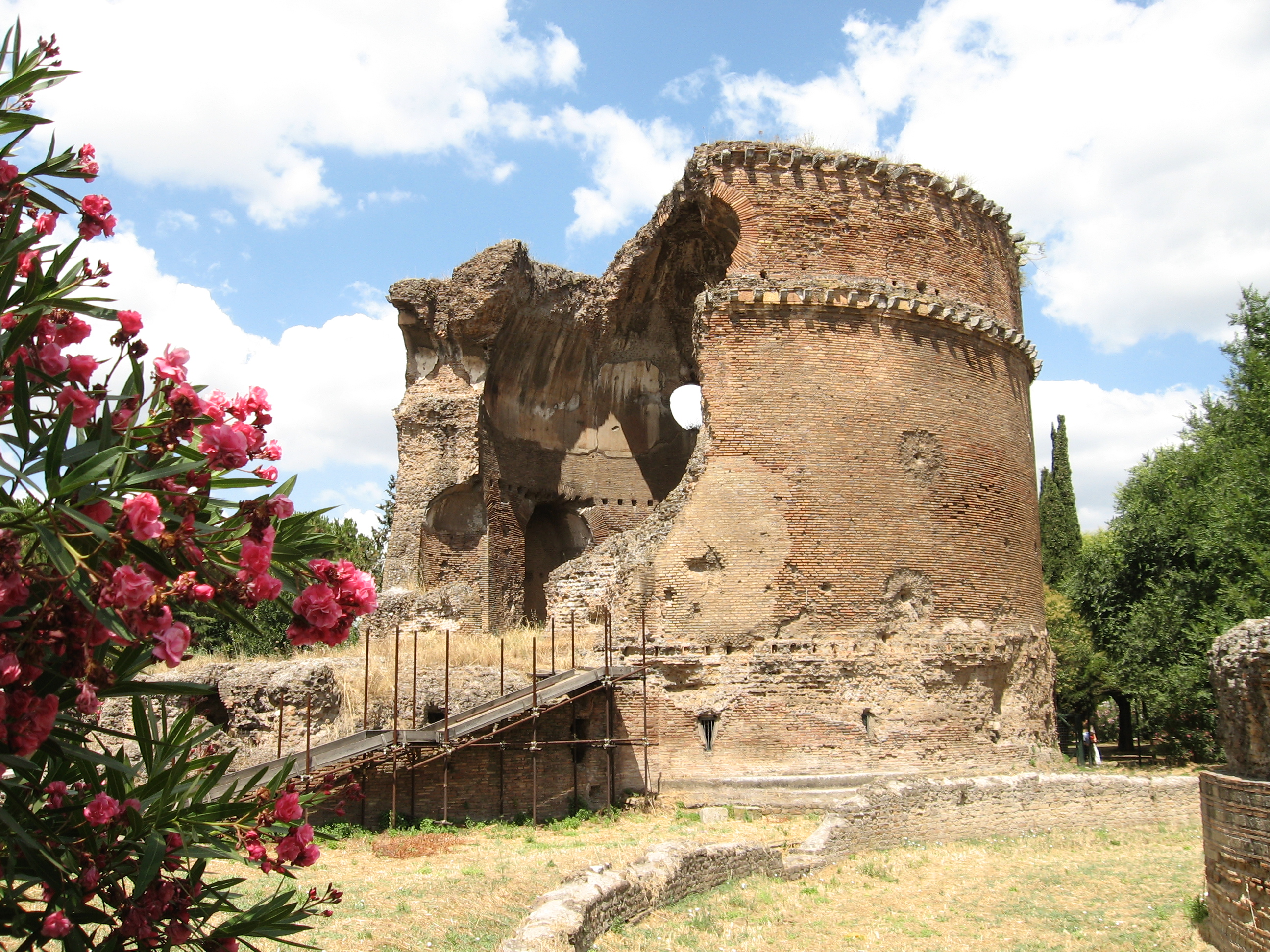
- The "Mausoleum" of Villa Gordiani, the best preserved monument of the park.
- Interactive map of Villa Gordiani
- 41°53′38.99″N 12°33′13.57″E

Villa Gordiani is a park along the Via Prenestina, in Rome, Italy. It is home to several ancient Roman remains, traditionally identified with the villa of the Gordian imperial family, which included three Roman emperors of the 3rd century, Gordian I, Gordian II and Gordian III.

== History ==
The complex, which is mentioned in ancient sources such as the Historia Augusta, had a portico with some 200 columns, in different stones. It also included basilicas and baths.

During the 13th century, the Tor de' Schiavi (literally "Tower of the Slaves", although the name derives from the dello Schiavo family, who acquired it in 1571) was built over the remains. In 1422 the area was acquired by the Colonna family. The monumental entrance of the villa is an octagonal structure dating perhaps to the late 3rd-early 4th century, when the villa was enlarged and restored.

The complex and the garden were restored in the 1960s, and has now the status of an archaeological park. It is divided in two sectors by the Via Prenestina.

== Gallery ==
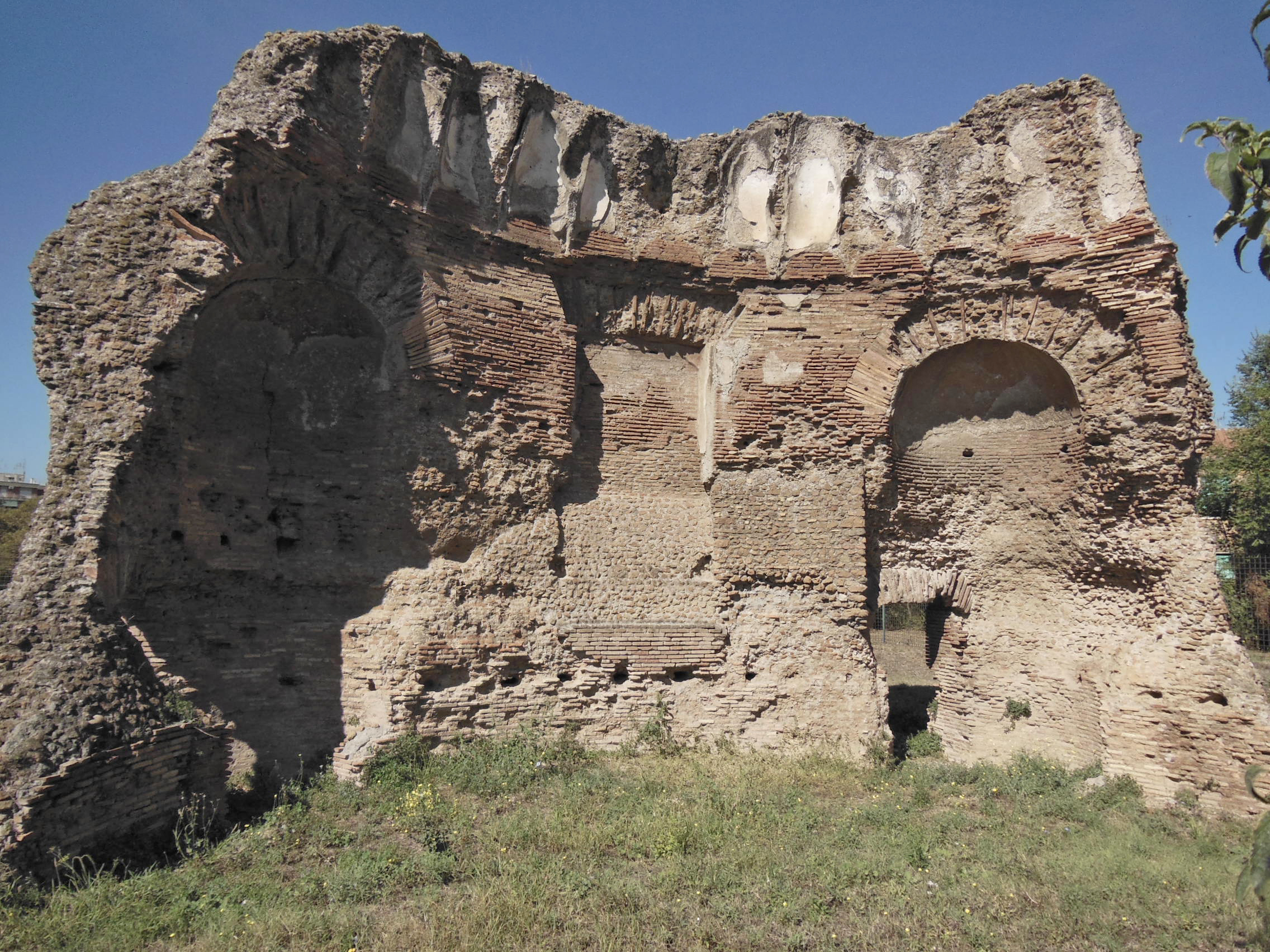
Aula absidata

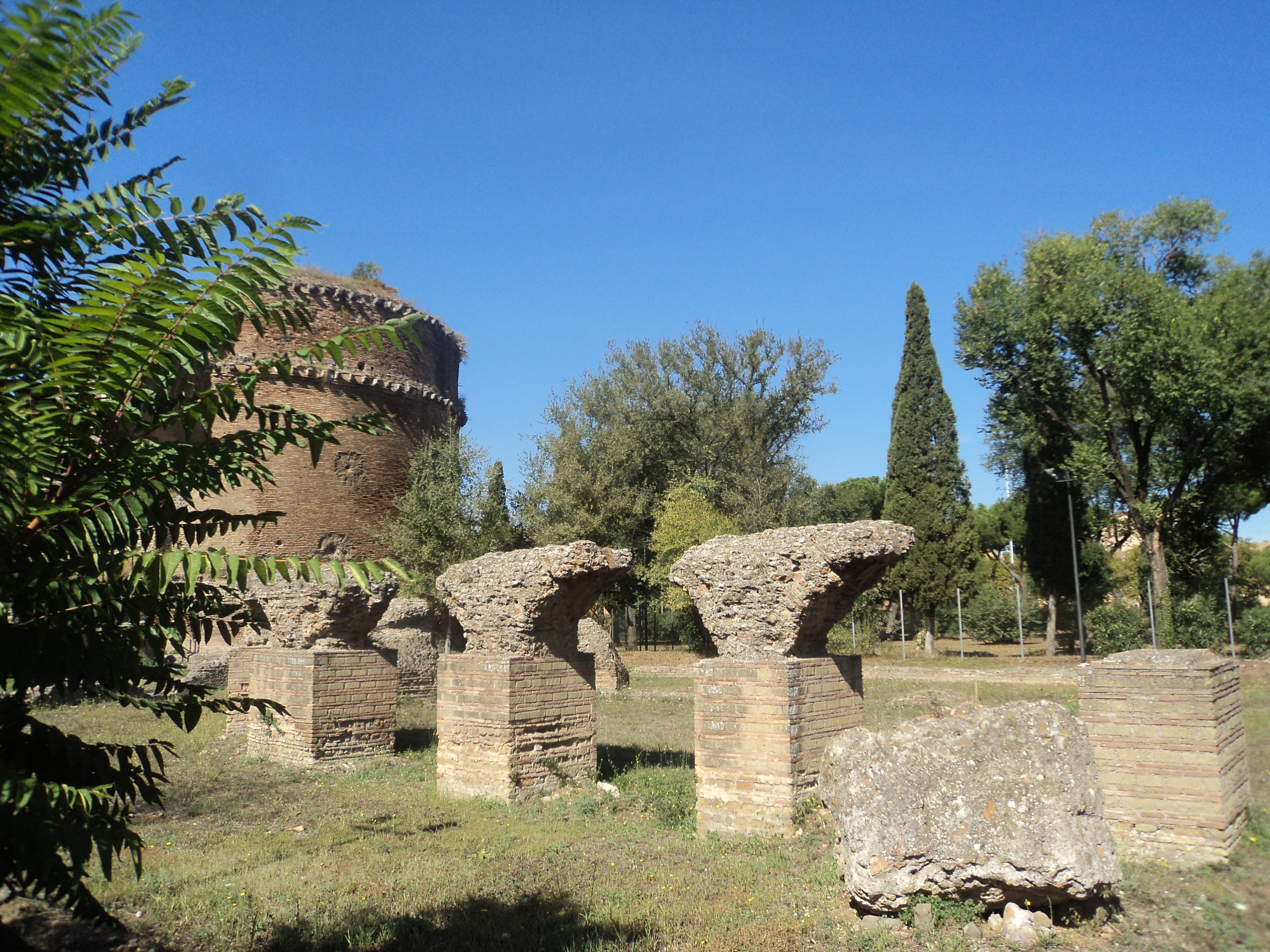
Basilica paleocristiana

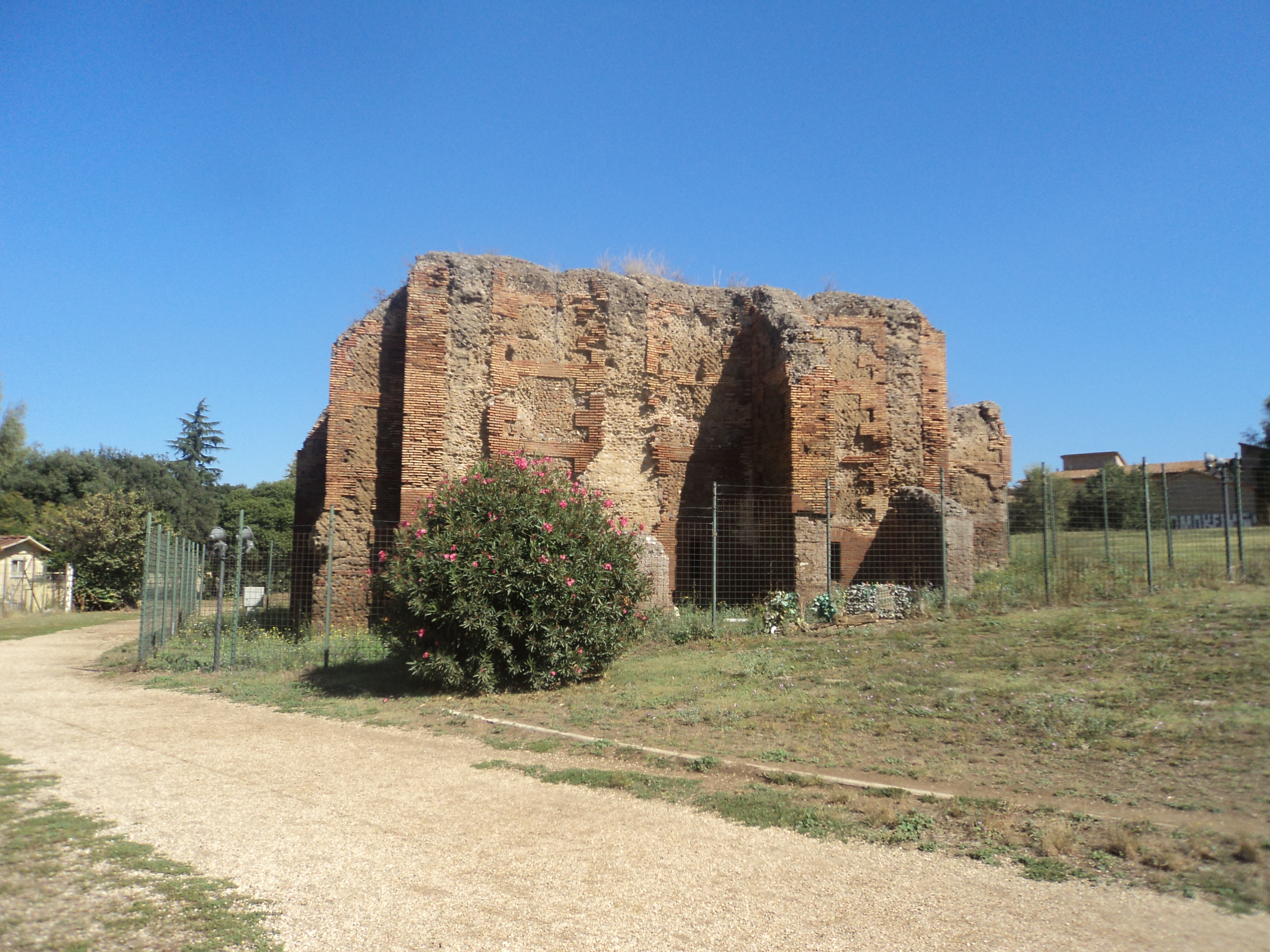
Cisterne

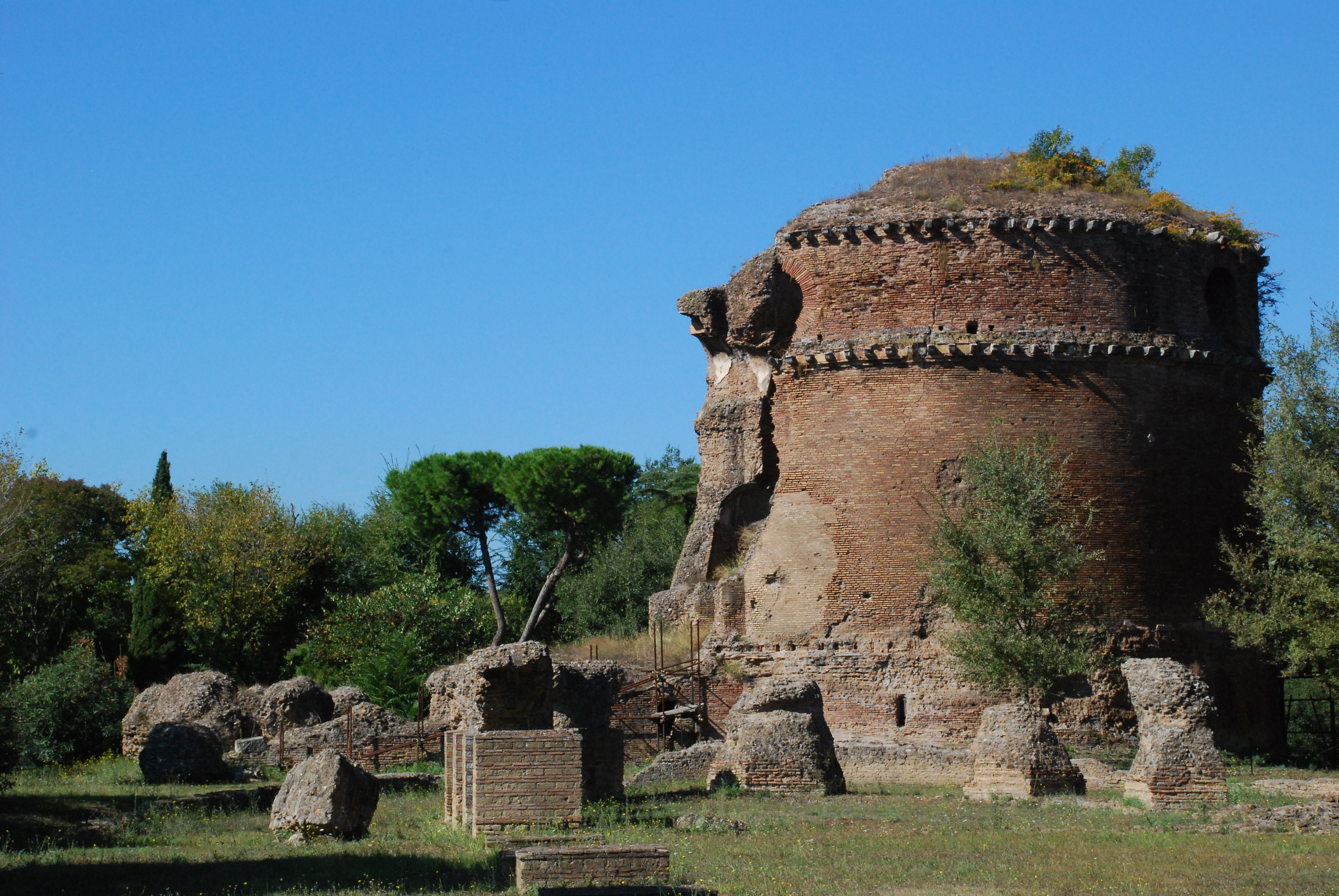
Mausoleum

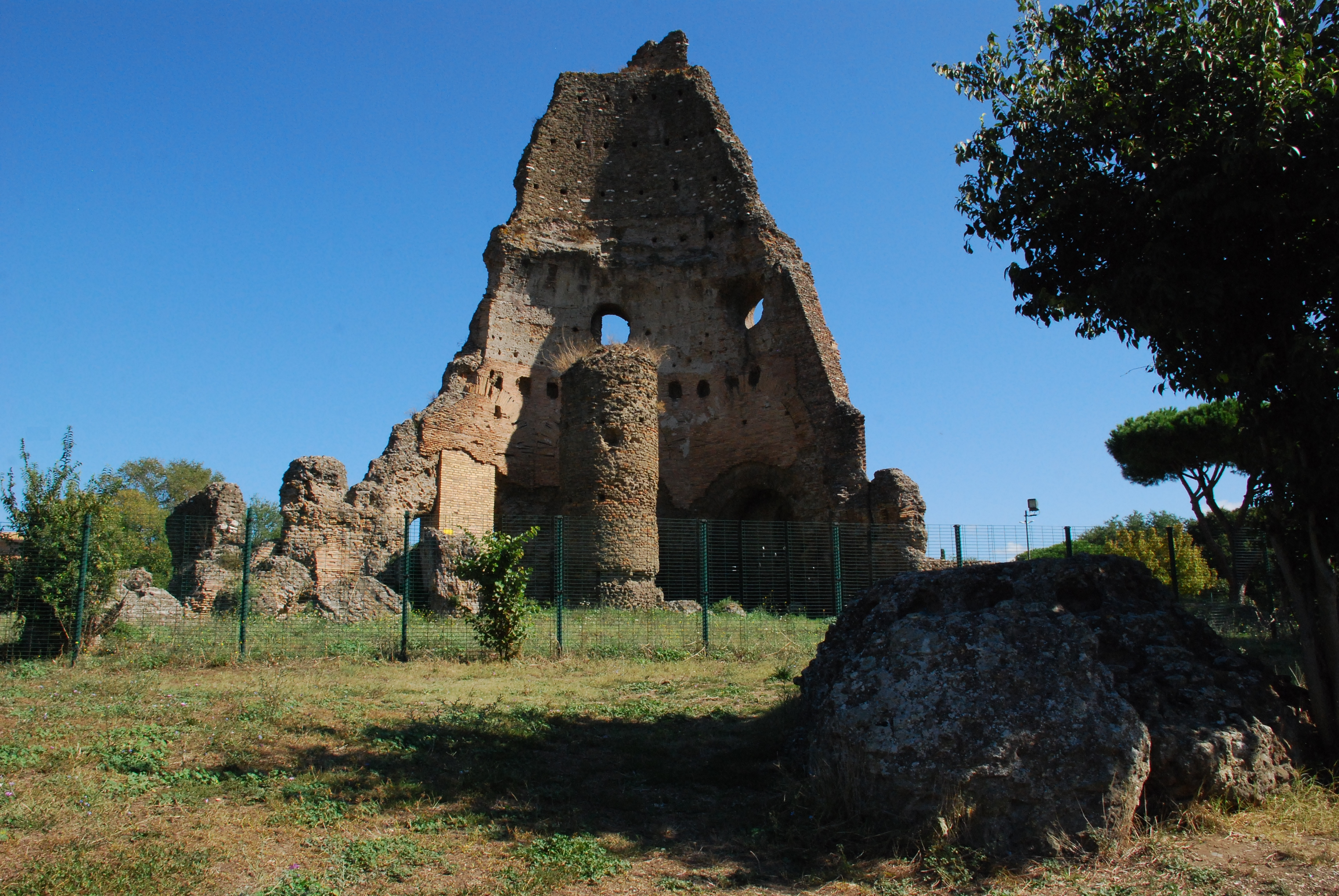
Tor dei Schiavi

== See also ==
- Roman gardens
- Ancient Roman architecture index
- Ancient Roman and Byzantine domes

== Sources ==
- Roma. Milan: Touring Editore. 1999. p. 788. ISBN 978-88-365-1324-6.
- Sfameni, Carla (2006). Ville residenziali nell'Italia tardoantica. Bari: Edipuglia. pp. 98, 137. ISBN 978-88-7228-475-9.

Preceded by Palace of Domitian	Landmarks of Rome; Villa Gordiani	Succeeded by Villa of Livia
