= Catacombs of Marcellinus and Peter =

Ancient Rome artifact

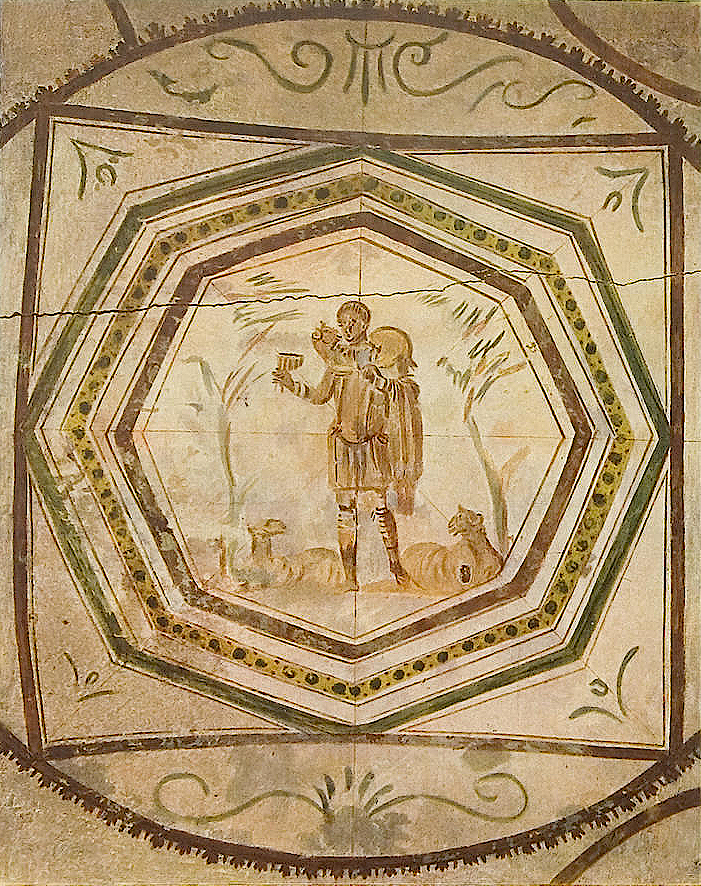
The Good Shepherd, Catacomb of Petrus and Marcellinus, mid-3rd century A.D.

The Catacombs of Marcellinus and Peter are found approximately three kilometers from southeast Rome and the ancient Via Labicana, and date to the 4th century AD. The catacombs were named in reference to the Christian martyrs Marcellinus and Peter who may have been buried there according to legend, near the body of St. Tiburtius.

During excavations performed from 2004 to 2010, an estimated 20,000 skeletons were discovered in these catacombs; the skeletons were buried in loculi (individually buried within a niche), arcosolia (a burial under an arched recess), or cubicala (individuals grouped together into a burial chamber). The catacombs "cover 3 hectares with 4.5 kilometers of subterranean galleries on three different levels".

Within the catacombs is a variety of frescoes representative of pagan and Christian traditions and a few small artifacts. The significance of the pieces of art can be traced to the time period they were commissioned and some possible influence from the inhabitants of the catacombs.

== Wall paintings ==
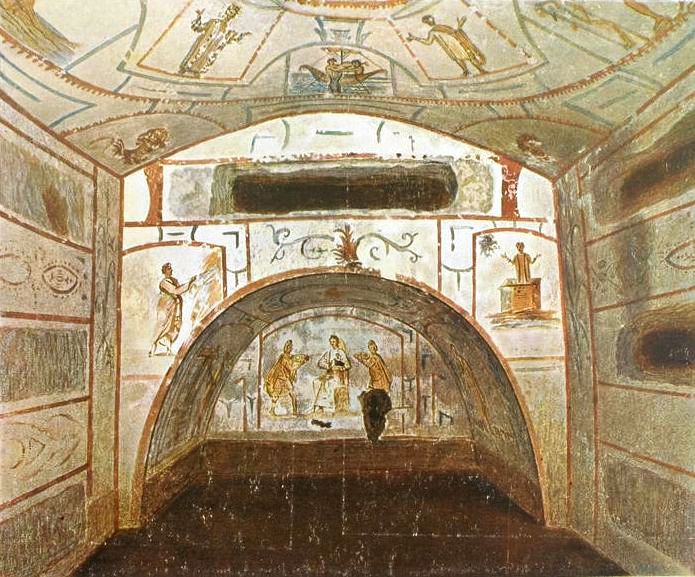
One of the chambers in the Catacombs of Marcellinus and Peter

The fourth-century catacomb of Marcellinus and Peter contains a mixture of pagan and Christian imagery (both old and new testament). One room located within the catacomb, labeled as room 79, depicts imagery that demonstrates this mixture. A few of the images are Moses striking water from a rock, Orpheus/King David playing a lyre, the raising of Lazarus, and Daniel in the lion's den. Another room within the catacomb, room 66, contains paintings of athletes.

These examples of the intermingling of different types of images provide evidence about the shift towards Christian imagery. Also found within the catacomb of Marcellinus and Peter was a gold glass disk fragment depicting controversial Jewish and Christian imagery. The disk fragment is decorated with a tomb with a freestanding column on either side and a menorah located in its front.

== Significance of the artwork ==
The culture of Rome was captured in the art through the blend of pagan and Christian imagery, a slow transition that occurred as a result of the gradual shift towards Christianity. By the fourth century, images of Christ and the apostles could be found within the catacombs, represented more realistically than previous paintings. Another common theme that arose in catacomb frescoes was the story of Jonah.

=== Jonah fresco ===
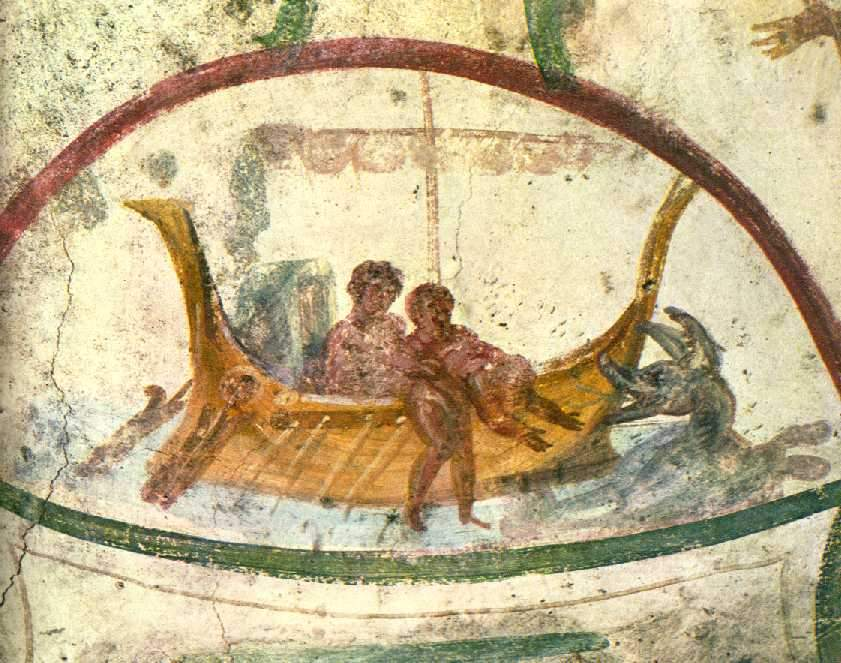
Image of Jonah being lowered into the sea in the midst of the storm as a sacrifice to save those aboard the ship.

The representation of Jonah is unique and stems from two different sources of inspiration: Roman pagan art which influenced the "gestures and visual formulae" and Jewish midrashic origins that played a role in the development of the non-biblical story behind the depicted episodes. Located on a ceiling within the catacomb of Marcellinus and Peter is a fresco recounting the story of Jonah. The different scenes depicted are: Jonah boarding a ship from Joppa to Tardish to avoid his given task; Jonah being thrown into the raging sea as penance for disobeying God; Jonah being swallowed by a large fish where he resided for three days and nights; Jonah being spewed from the fish and preaching repentance to the Ninevites; and the final scene of Jonah sitting under the shade of a booth he built to watch for the impending destruction of Nineveh.

The depictions of the story of Jonah were given validation by evangelists and led to the further adoption within art of the time. There are several theories regarding the significance of the story of Jonah. One theory is tied to a Hebrew prayer from the Hellenistic-Mishnaic period that was the "basis for the Christian Ordo Commendationis Animae" and says, "He who answered the prayer of [Jonah], He will answer us." A second theory is that the story depicts the mercy of God, an idea that would be highly desired for those departing from the world and into eternity.

The scenes of the story of Jonah in the catacomb of Marcellinus and Peter, while traditional in context, contains variations from some of the traditional representations. A similarity to most other catacomb representations of Jonah is in the scene where he is thrown off of the ship heading away from Nineveh. In this scene, Jonah is depicted as naked and is commonly interpreted as symbolic of the sailors throwing all unnecessary cargo overboard in an attempt to keep the ship from sinking in the storm. There are some who believe that this depiction could have origins in marine pagan art.

One aspect of the image of Jonah being thrown overboard that is more rare in catacomb paintings is that Jonah, instead of going headfirst into the ocean, appears to be lowered into the sea feet first by the sailors. This image is more traditional of Jewish midrashic interpretation, lending to the theory that the painting in the catacomb of Marcellinus and Peter is more Jewish than Christian in origin and importance. Another aspect of the scenes of Jonah that supports this theory is the large fish that was represented, a ketos rather than the traditionally depicted Leviathan.

== Skeletons excavated ==
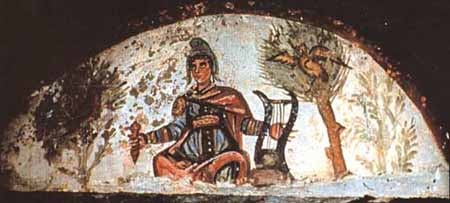
Orpheus adorned in Roman battle attire playing a lyre from the walls of the Catacombs of Marcellinus and Peter.

In recent years, there have been several studies conducted on the catacombs of Marcellinus and Peter analyzing how the conditions within the catacombs effect the preservation of the skeletons. The overall agreed conclusion is that the thermal history within catacombs are highly favorable for bone preservation, even more so than that of skeletons exposed to open-air environments. Bones located within larger catacomb chambers have been found to be significantly better preserved than bones located within the catacomb's smaller chambers. The hypothesis that many pathologists are working with is that bones located in close proximity to the catacomb walls are subject to some environmental conditions, specifically runoff and increased humidity; bones discovered near the center of the chambers are not subject to such conditions. This explains why bones located within smaller chambers are not in as good a condition because nearly every skeleton would be located close to the walls of the chamber. Bones found in smaller chambers of the catacombs are also affected by diagenesis (the conversion of sediment to sedimentary rock that results in a chemical or physical change) due to the confined space.

From the years 2004 to 2010, the central areas of the catacombs of Marcellinus and Peter underwent excavation. During the excavation process, several mass graves dating from the first and third century AD were discovered in the previously unknown funerary space. The mass graves consisted of tens to hundreds of articulated skeletons, depending on the size of the chamber they were located in. Artifact dating and radiocarbon dating performed at the time verified the dates in which the skeletons were buried within the catacombs; the bodies appear to have undergone "complex burial rites" that consisted of some of the bodies being covered in plaster or amber and wrapped in textiles. The ages of the skeletons within the catacombs is difficult to pinpoint; however, it appears that it ranges from young adults to adults and that both sexes are present. One theory that pathologists have regarding the circumstances that resulted in the mass graves' existence is that there was some form of an epidemic during this time.

== See also ==
- List of ancient monuments in Rome
- Mausoleum of Helena

== Bibliography ==
- Deckers, Johannes G.; Seeliger, Hans Reinhard; Mietke, Gabriele (1987). Die Katakombe „Santi Marcellino e Pietro“. Repertorium der Malereien [The Catacomb „Santi Marcellino e Pietro“. Repertory of paintings]. Roma sotterranea cristiana, vol. 6. Vatican City: Pontificio Istitutio di Archaeologia Christiana, ISBN 3-402-05280-6.
