= Regio IX Circus Flaminius =

Historical region of Rome

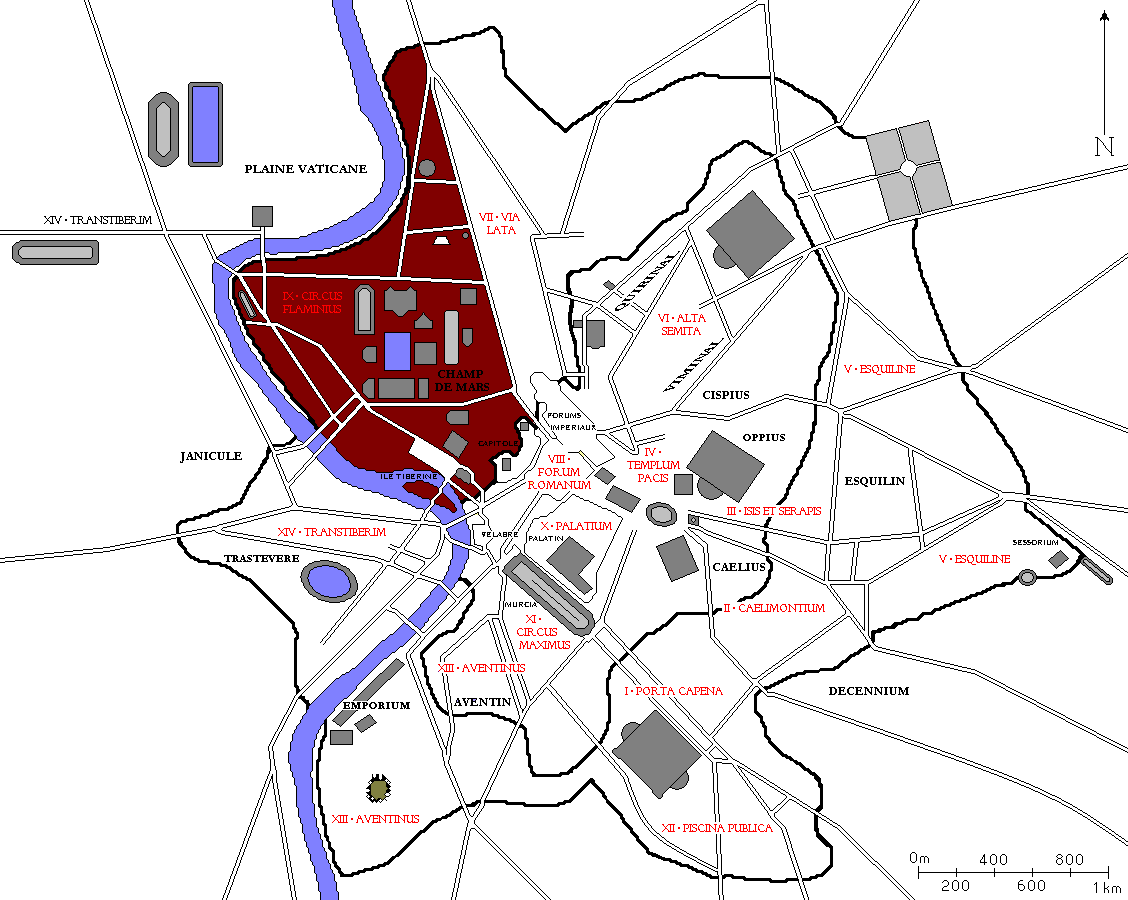

The Regio IX Circus Flaminius is the ninth regio of imperial Rome, under Augustus's administrative reform. Regio IX took its name from the racecourse located in the southern end of the Campus Martius, close to Tiber Island. It is where Julius Caesar was assassinated.

== Geographic extent and important features ==
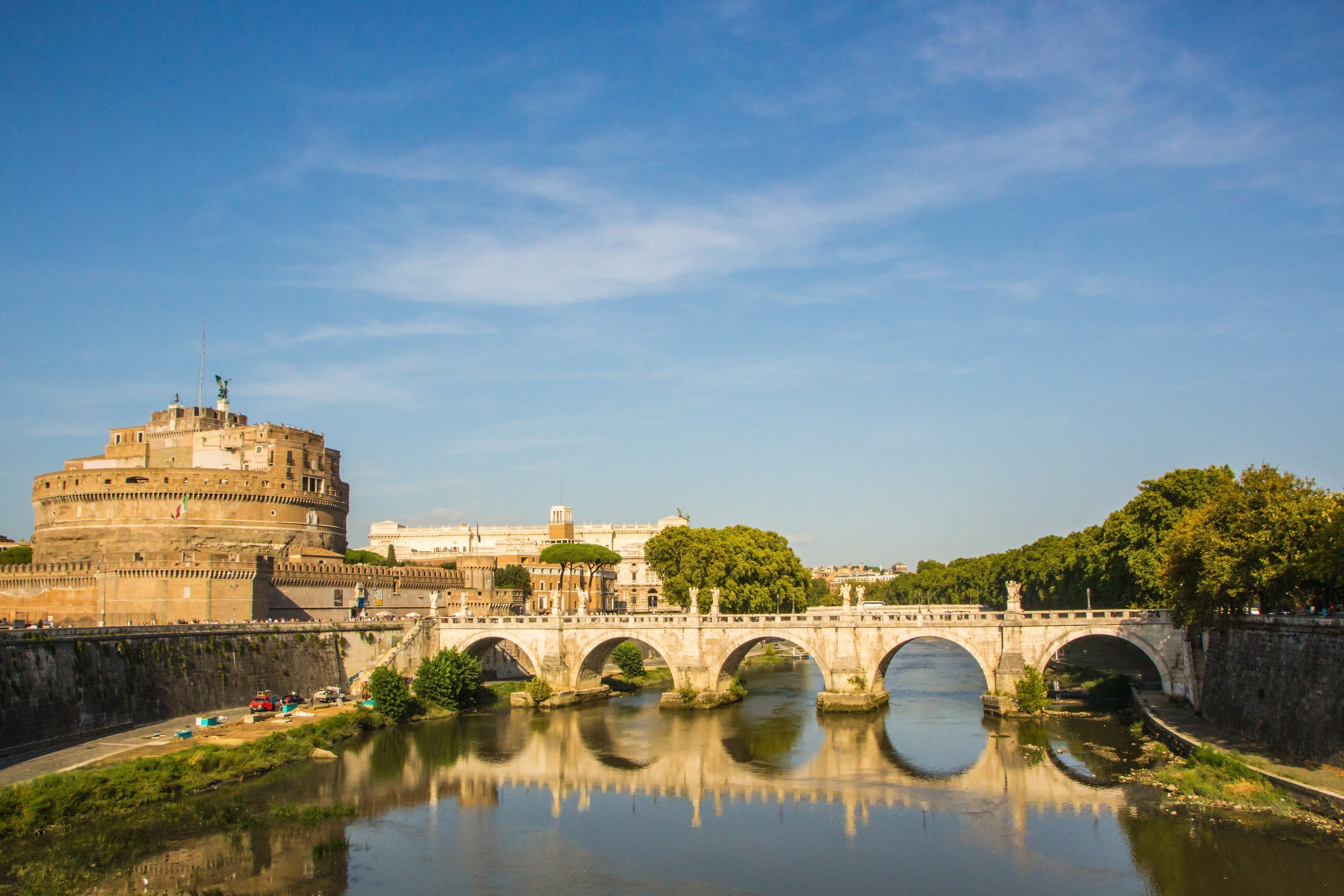
Ponte Sant'Angelo

Regio IX was defined by the presence of the Circus Flaminius, situated on the Campus Martius, whose field stood well into the Middle Ages. In extent, the region was bordered by the Servian Wall and the Ponte Sant'Angelo to the south, the Tiber River to the east, the Aurelian Walls to the north to the point where the Piazza del Popolo sits, and the Via Lata to the west, meaning is occupied the majority of the Campus Martius. The area was devastated by the Great Fire of Rome in the year 64 and another fire in the year 80 almost completely destroyed this region, but was rebuilt by subsequent emperors. A measurement taken at the end of the 4th century recorded that the perimeter of the region was 32,500 Roman feet (approximately 9.62 km), making it the second largest of the Augustan regions.

Attached to the Circus Flaminius were the four stables that belonged to each of the factions in the chariot races: the Red, White, Green, and Blue teams. Additional entertainment was provided at the Amphitheater of Statilius Taurus, and the region also hosted three theatres: the Theatre of Balbus (Theatrum Balbi), which had 11,510 seats; the Theatre of Marcellus (Theatrum Marcelli) which had 17,580 seats; and the Theatre of Pompey (Theatrum Pompeii) which held 22,888 seats. Attached to Pompey's theatre was an enclosed public garden, the Portico of Pompey, while Balbus's theatre was attached to the Crypta Balbi. Other porticos in the region were the Portico of Philippus (Porticus Philippi), which enclosed the Temple of Hercules Musarum; the Portico of Octavia (Porticus Octaviae), which enclosed the Temples of Juno Regina and Jupiter Stator; and the doubled portico of the Porticus Minucia Frumentaria adjacent to the Largo di Torre Argentina. It was from the Minucia that Roman citizens received the grain dole.

Additionally, this region also contained the Portico of Europa, the Portico of the Argonauts (Porticus Argonautarum), and the Porticus Meleagri), the last two being adjacent to the Saepta Julia, where citizens gathered to cast their votes. Finally, near the banks of the Tiber also stood the Porticus Maximae, constructed in the names of the emperors Gratian, Valentinian II and Theodosius I, very near a triumphal arch also built by them which stood in front of the Ponte Sant'Angelo. Near here was also located the Ciconiae Nixae, a name that continues to perplex scholars.

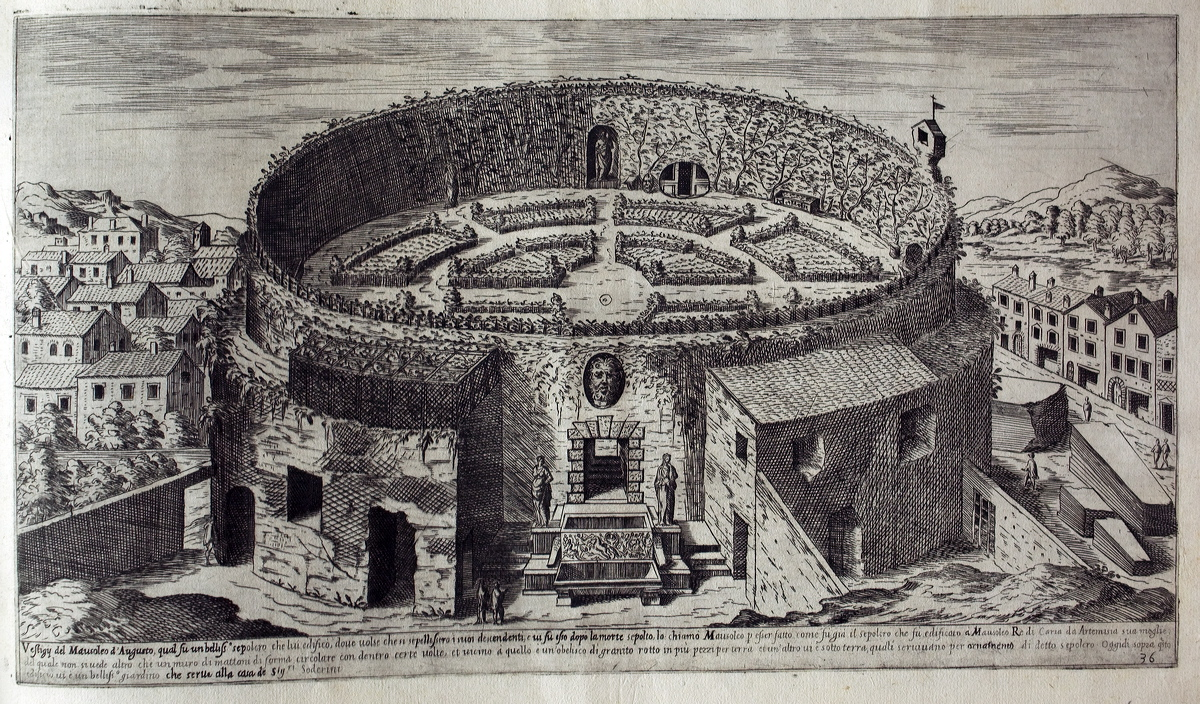
Drawing of the ruins of the Mausoleum of Augustus (1575)

In terms of other types of monuments and buildings, this region possessed the ancient Altar of Mars (located beside the modern Doria Pamphilj Gallery) to the south, while to the north sat the Mausoleum of Augustus. Between these two points stood the Stadium of Domitian (situated on the site of the present day Piazza Navona), the Trigarium (an equestrian training ground located south of the bend of the Tiber River) and the Odeon, built for musical competitions, which was counted amongst the most admired of the works built by the emperor Constantius II. Near the Trigarium was the Tarentum, an open air space where religious rites were carried out.

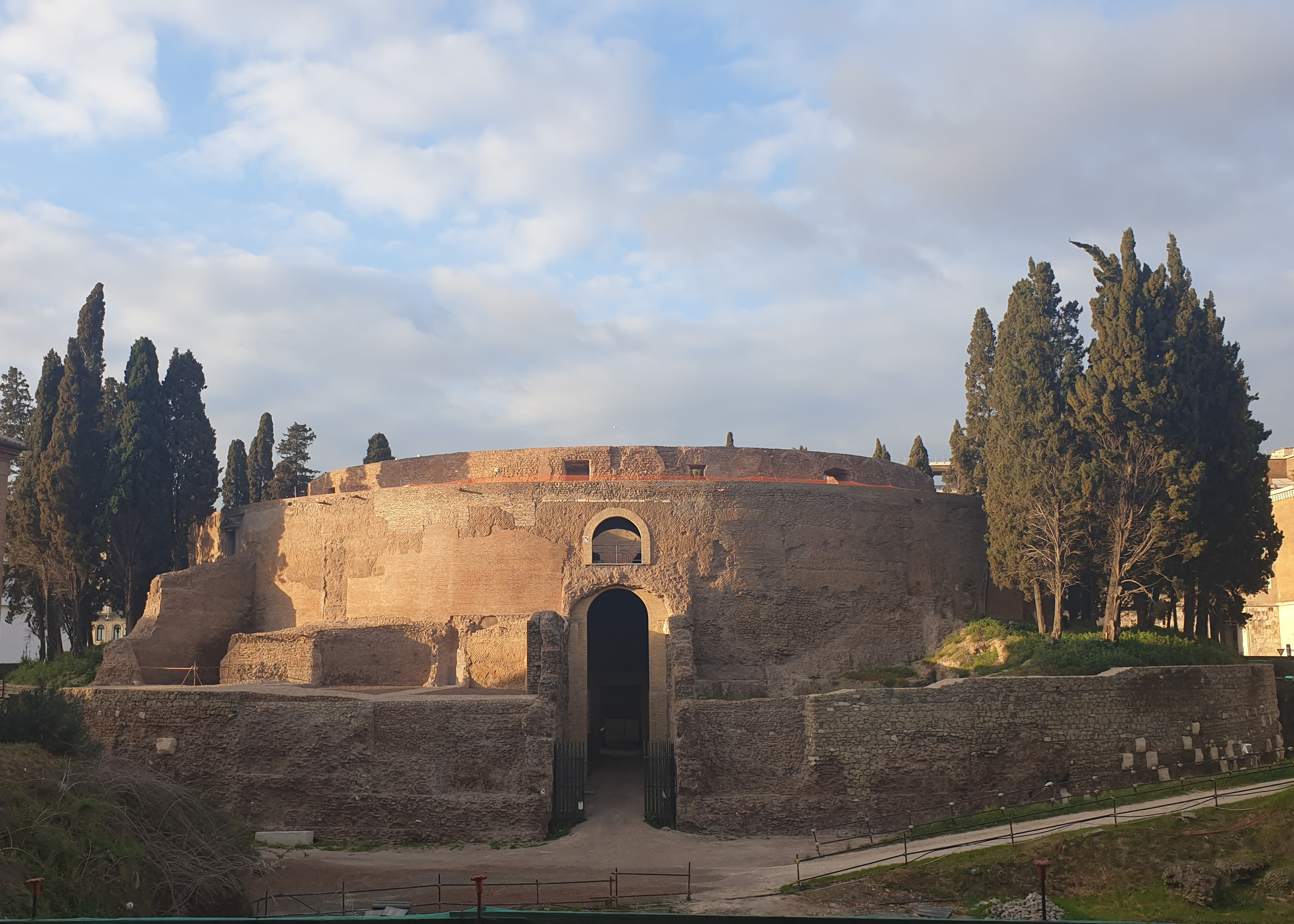
The remains of the Mausoleum of Augustus

In this region still stands the Hadrianic reconstruction of the Pantheon of Marcus Vipsanius Agrippa, but the adjacent Baths of Agrippa have long since vanished, as have the Baths of Nero that were later enlarged by Severus Alexander. To the west of the Pantheon stood the Temple of Minerva Chalcidica and the Temple of Isis and Serapis. Several other buildings were constructed in this part of the Regio IX during the period of the Nerva–Antonine dynasty. These included the Temple of Matidia, the Temple of Marcia, the Temple of Hadrian, the Temple of Marcus Aurelius, and two columns, that of Antoninus Pius and Marcus Aurelius. Near where the Column of Antoninus Pius stood was also kept the Solarium Augusti, a giant sundial, as well as the Ara Pacis, the Altar of Peace.

As the lands beyond the Servian Wall were traditionally not held to be part of the city of Rome, the Campus Martius also possessed several tombs, which were not permitted to be placed within the traditional limits of the city. Chief amongst these was the Mausoleum of Augustus, built to house the remains of the emperor and his family. This mausoleum also included the remains of Marcus Vipsanius Agrippa, who had already built a tomb for himself where the Piazza del Popolo now sits. At the turn of the 5th century, the Regio contained 35 aediculae (temples and shrines), 140 domūs (patrician houses), 25 horrea (warehouses), 63 balneae (bath houses), and 120 loci (fountains).

== Subdivisions ==
At the turn of the 5th century, the Regio was divided into 35 vici (districts) and 2,777 insulae (blocks). It had two curators and was served by 48 Roman magistrates.
