= Temple of Juno Regina =

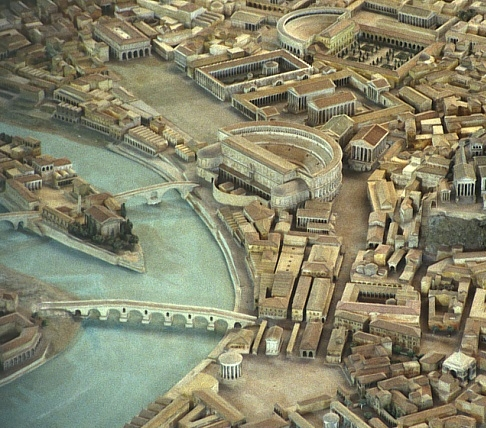
The Temples of Juno Regina (north) and Jupiter Stator in the Porticus Octaviae behind the Theater of Marcellus in Gismondi's model of ancient Rome at the Museum of Roman Civilization

The Temple of Juno Regina (Latin: Aedes Iuno Regina) was a temple dedicated to the Roman goddess Juno Regina ("Queen Juno") located near the Circus Flaminius in the southern Campus Martius of ancient Rome. It was solemnly vowed by the consul Marcus Aemilius Lepidus in 187 BC during his final battle against the Liguri and was consecrated and opened on 23 December 179 BC, while he was serving as censor. It was linked by a portico to a temple of Fortuna, possibly the Temple of Fortuna Equestris, and later joined by a temple of Jupiter Stator. Both temples were surrounded by the Portico of Metellus. The portico and both temples were rebuilt by Augustus as the Porticus Octaviae sometime after 27 BC.

== See also ==
- List of Ancient Roman temples
