= Arch of Germanicus (Rome) =

Ancient Roman arch celebrating the life of Germanicus

- Type: Triumphal arch
- Location: Regio IX Circus Flaminius

History
- Built: early 1st century
- Built by: Tiberius

The Arch of Germanicus was an arch of Rome situated at the northern end of the Circus Flaminius.

== History and description ==
The Roman Senate decreed for an arch to be constructed to celebrate the victories of the Roman general Germanicus following his death in 19 CE. The arch was to display gilded figures representing the nations he had conquered, together with an inscription describing his military campaigns. Atop the arch were twelve statues, and pride of place over the arch’s centre was a statue of Germanicus in a triumphal chariot. Alongside his statue were other statues of his family; his father Nero Claudius Drusus, his mother Antonia Minor, his wife Agrippina the Elder, his sons and daughters (including Caligula), as well as his brother Claudius and his sister Livilla.

Attached to the Circus Flaminius, the arch was set up between the Porticus Octaviae and the Theatre of Marcellus, close to where the statues of Augustus and his family had been dedicated by Gaius Norbanus Flaccus, the Roman consul of 15 CE, after the death of Augustus.

The fate of the arch is unclear. It was almost certainly damaged in the fire that burned that part of the city, including the adjacent Porticus Octaviae, in 80 CE, after which it may or may not have been restored. It is certainly not listed in the 4th century inventory of the main buildings and structures of the Regio IX Circus Flaminius (the Curiosum – Notitia), so it was probably no longer extant by the 330s.

== See also ==
- List of Roman triumphal arches

== Bibliography ==
- Richardson, L. A New Topographical Dictionary of Ancient Rome, 1992
