= Temple of Jupiter Stator (2nd century BC) =

2nd century BC Roman temple on the campus Martius

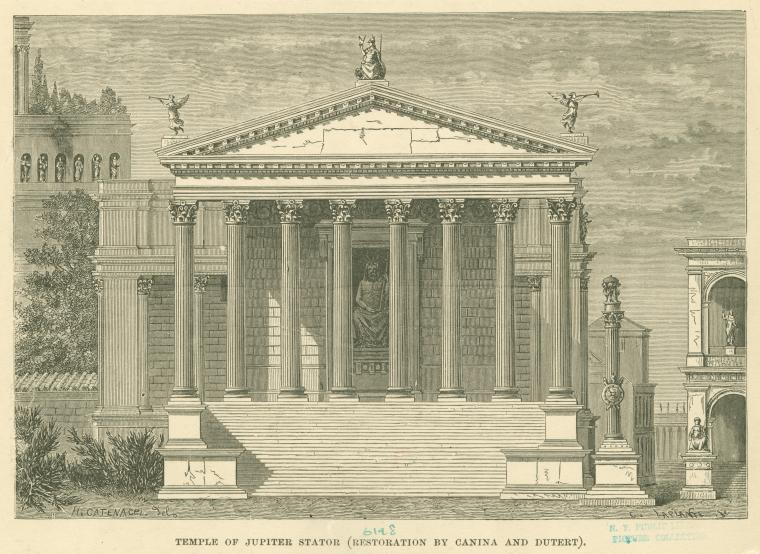
- Temple of Jupiter Stator (in a 19th-century graphical reconstruction)

- Shown in ancient Rome
- Interactive map of Temple of Jupiter Stator
- 41°53′35″N 12°28′46″E

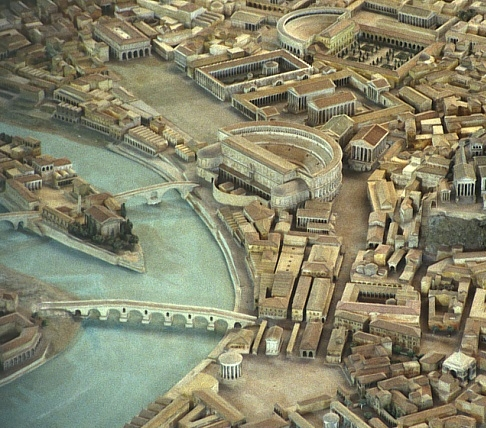
The Temples of Juno Regina (north) and Jupiter Stator (south) in the Porticus Octaviae behind the Theater of Marcellus in Gismondi's model of imperial Rome at the Museum of Roman Civilization

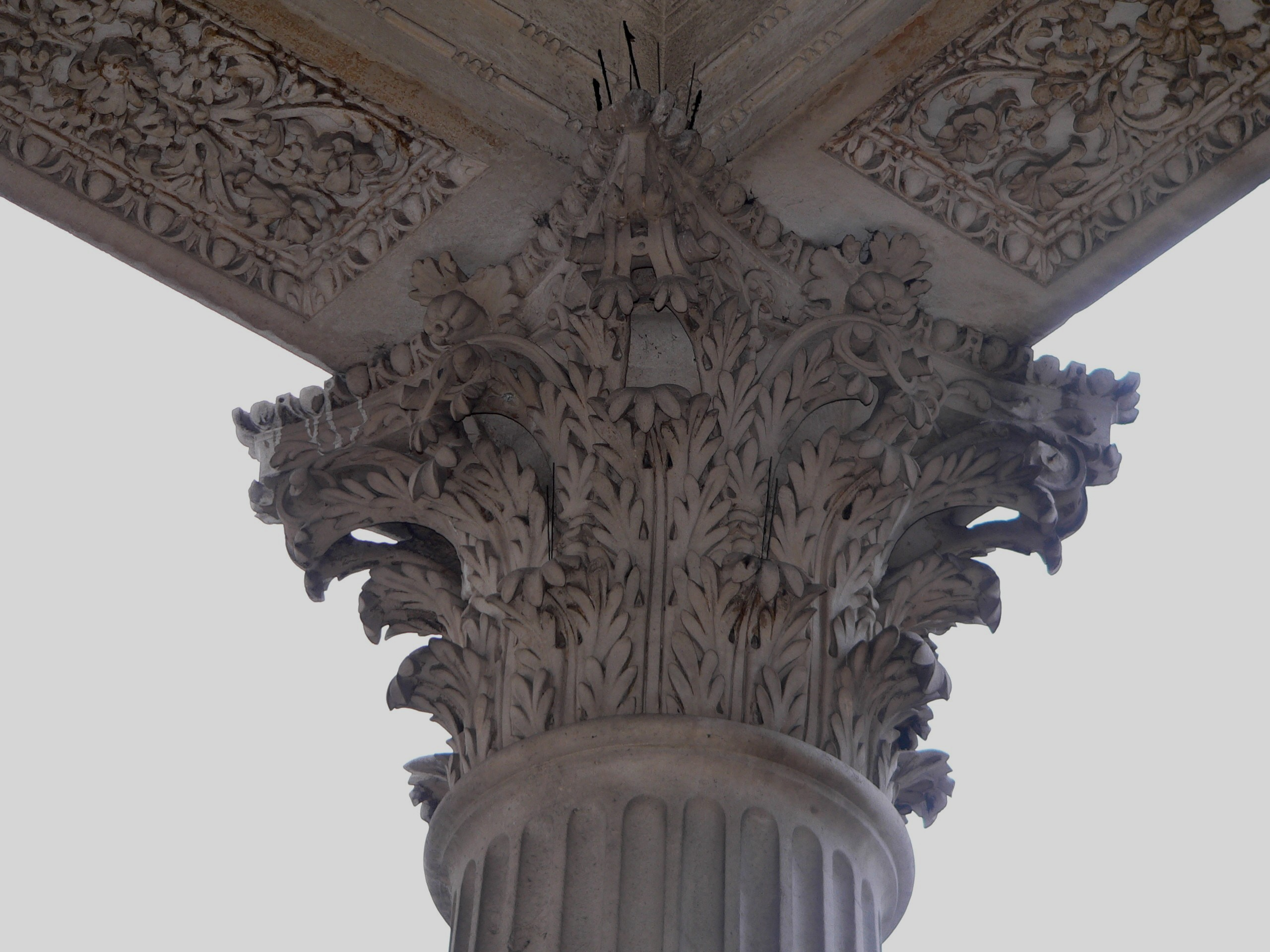
A Corinthian capital of Chiswick Villa, inspired by descriptions of the Temple of Jupiter Stator.

The Temple of Jupiter Stator (Latin: Aedes Iovis Statoris; Jupiter the Sustainer), also known to the ancient Romans as the Metellan Temple of Jupiter (Aedes Iovis Metellina) and the Temple of Metellus (Aedes Metelli), was a temple dedicated to the Roman god Jupiter Stator. It was located beside the Temple of Juno Regina in the Porticus Octaviae in the southern Campus Martius before its destruction in the AD 64 Great Fire of Rome.

== History ==
The Temple of Jupiter Stator was built by Quintus Caecilius Metellus Macedonicus after his triumph in 146 BC. Vitruvius stated it was the work of Hermodorus of Salamis, and Velleius stated Metellus was the first to build a temple in Rome out of marble, presumably referring to this temple. It was a hexastyle peripteral building with six columns along the short sides and eleven on the long sides. The space between the columns was equal to that between the columns and the wall of the cella. The previous idea that an Ionic capital—now in S. Lorenzo Fuori le Mura—has anything to do with the temple has generally been abandoned.

It was built beside M. Aemilius Lepidus's earlier Temple of Juno Regina ("Queen Juno") and enclosed with it inside the Porticus Metelli ("Portico of Metellus"). As there were no inscriptions on the temples and evidently representations of a lizard (Ancient Greek: σαύρα, saúra) and a frog (βάτραχος, bátrokhos) among the decorations, the legend arose that the architects were two Spartans named Saurus and Batrachus and that as the decorations in the temple of Jupiter belonged to that of Juno and vice versa, the statues of the deities had been set up in the wrong cellae by the mistake of the workmen. These were all near the Circus Flaminius in the southern Campus Martius. Each temple was fronted by an altar (ara) and Metellus placed Lysippus's equestrian statues of Alexander the Great's generals before these.

Augustus rebuilt both temples and the portico as the Porticus Octaviae sometime after 27 BC. In 64 AD, the Great Fire of Rome ravaged much of the city, completely devastating three of and partially destroying seven of the city's fourteen districts. The Temple of Jupiter Stator was completely destroyed, along with the House of the Vestals, the Domus Transitoria (Nero's first palace), the Temple of Luna, and much of Rome.

The exact site of the Temple of Jupiter Stator is known to have been used for the church of Santa Maria in Campitelli, with the Via della Tribuna di Campitelli running between it and the former site of the Temple of Juno Regina.

== See also ==
- Temple of Jupiter Stator (3rd century BC)
- List of Ancient Roman temples
