= Temple of Hercules Musarum =

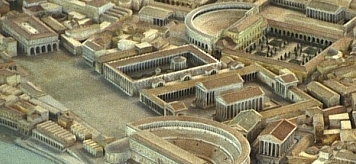
The Temple of Hercules Musarum in the Portico of Philippus in Gismondi's model, Museum of Roman Civilization

The Temple of Hercules Musarum (Aedes Herculis Musarum) was a Roman temple dedicated to Hercules Musarum ("Hercules of the Muses") located near the Circus Flaminius in the southern Campus Martius in ancient Rome.

== History ==
The temple was built by the consul Marcus Fulvius Nobilior, who conquered the Macedonian city of Ambracia in 189 BC. It was probably completed and dedicated during his triumph in 187 BC. Having earned scorn for enriching himself by raiding Greek temples, Fulvius Nobilior supposedly erected a portico around an earlier temple of Hercules in the Campus Martius, most likely that of Hercules Magnus Custos ("Hercules the Great Guardian"). He donated the copies of the fasti and statues he had taken from Ambracia, including a statue group of the Muses, after which the temple became known as Hercules Musarum, a calque of the Greek Hercules Musagetes (Ηρακλής Μουσαγέτης, Hēraklḗs Mousagétēs), Hercules as leader of the Muses. The temple later became the home of the Roman poets' guild (collegium poetarum).

The Portico of Octavius (Porticus Octavia) was later built around the temple. Around 33–29 BC, Octavian and his stepbrother L. Marcius Philippus refurbished the portico and temple, after which the area was known as the Portico of Philippus (Porticus Philippi).

The temple has not survived, but part of its floor plan is known from Fragment 33 of the 3rd century Forma Urbis Romae.

== See also ==
- Hercules in Roman religion
- Temple of Hercules Victor and Ara Maxima
