= Porticus Octavia =

Coordinates: 41.8939°N 12.4757°E

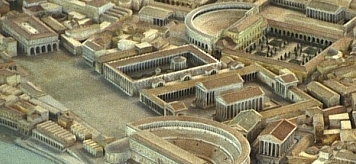
The Porticos of Octavia and Philippus in Gismondi's model at the Museum of Roman Civilization

The Porticus Octavia (Latin for the "Octavian Portico"), also known as the Portico of Octavius, was a portico in ancient Rome built by Gnaeus Octavius in 168 BC to commemorate his capture of Perseus of Macedonia during the Third Macedonian War. It stood between the Theatre of Pompey and the Circus Flaminius beside the Porticus Metelli. Pliny describes it as a double portico with bronze Corinthian capitals, for which it was also called the Corinthian Portico (Porticus Corinthia). It may have been the earliest use of this architectural order in Rome and is possibly to be identified with remains on the Via S. Nicola ai Cesarini, represented in the Severan Marble Plan (frg. 140). Velleius Paterculus called it "by far the loveliest" (multo amoenissima) of the porticoes of his time.

The portico surrounded the Temple of Hercules Musarum ("Hercules of the Muses") which the consul and censor Marcus Fulvius Nobilior erected c. 187 BC. It may have replaced or refurbished the portico that he supposedly erected around his temple at the time of its construction.

In 33 BC, Octavian (the future Augustus) recovered the military standards lost by Gabinius to the Illyrians and displayed them at the Porticus Octavia. Octavian and his stepbrother L. Marcius Philippus then entirely rebuilt it and the temple within to commemorate the conquest of Dalmatia. Cassius Dio (XLIX.43) confounded this Porticus Philippi ("Portico of Philippus") and the adjacent Porticus Octaviae, which Octavian established around the same time over the former Portico of Metellus. The Porticos of Octavius and Philippus have both left few traces.

== See also ==
- List of ancient monuments in Rome
