= Temple of Vulcan =

Ancient Roman temple

The Temple of Vulcan was a temple dedicated to Vulcan on the Campus Martius in Rome, probably near the Circus Flaminius. Legend holds that it was built by Romulus. It was struck by lightning in both 214 BC and 197 BC.

== See also ==
- List of Ancient Roman temples
