= Odeon of Domitian =

Ancient Roman theater in Rome

Odeum of Domitian
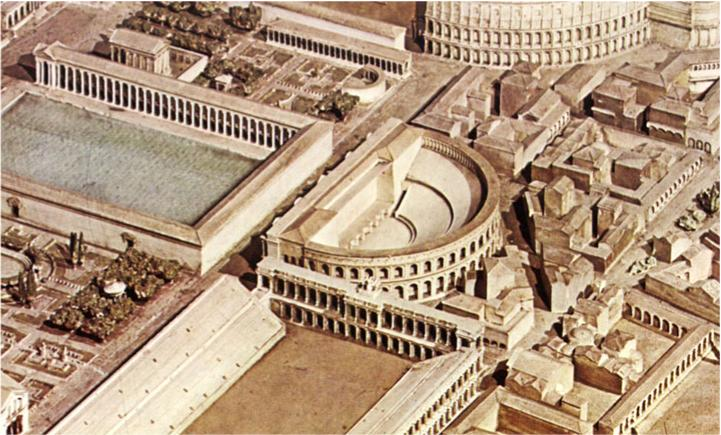
- Model of the Odeon of Domitian

- Location within Rome
- 41°53′48″N 12°28′25″E
- Type: Roman theatre
- Location: Regio XI Circus Maximus

History
- Built: 106 CE
- Built by: Domitian

The Odeon of Domitian was an ancient Roman building on the Campus Martius in Rome, used for plays and musical competitions and with room for an audience of 11,000. The first Odeum, at Rome, was built by Domitian in imitation of Greek odeons (neighbouring his stadium to its south). It was completed or restored in 106 by Apollodorus of Damascus. The outline of its cavea is still preserved by the façade of the Palazzo Massimo alle Colonne, but the only actual remains is a cipoline monolithic column (possibly part of the stage) just in front of the Palazzo's rear façade.

== Sources ==
- Suetonius, Life of Domitian, 5
- Platner & Ashby, Topographical Dictionary of Ancient Rome, article "Odeum"
- Plan de Rome
- The Architecture of Rome by Stefan Grundmann
- William Smith, A Dictionary of Greek and Roman Antiquities, London, 1875
