= Stadium of Domitian =

Ancient Roman stadium, a landmark of Rome, Italy

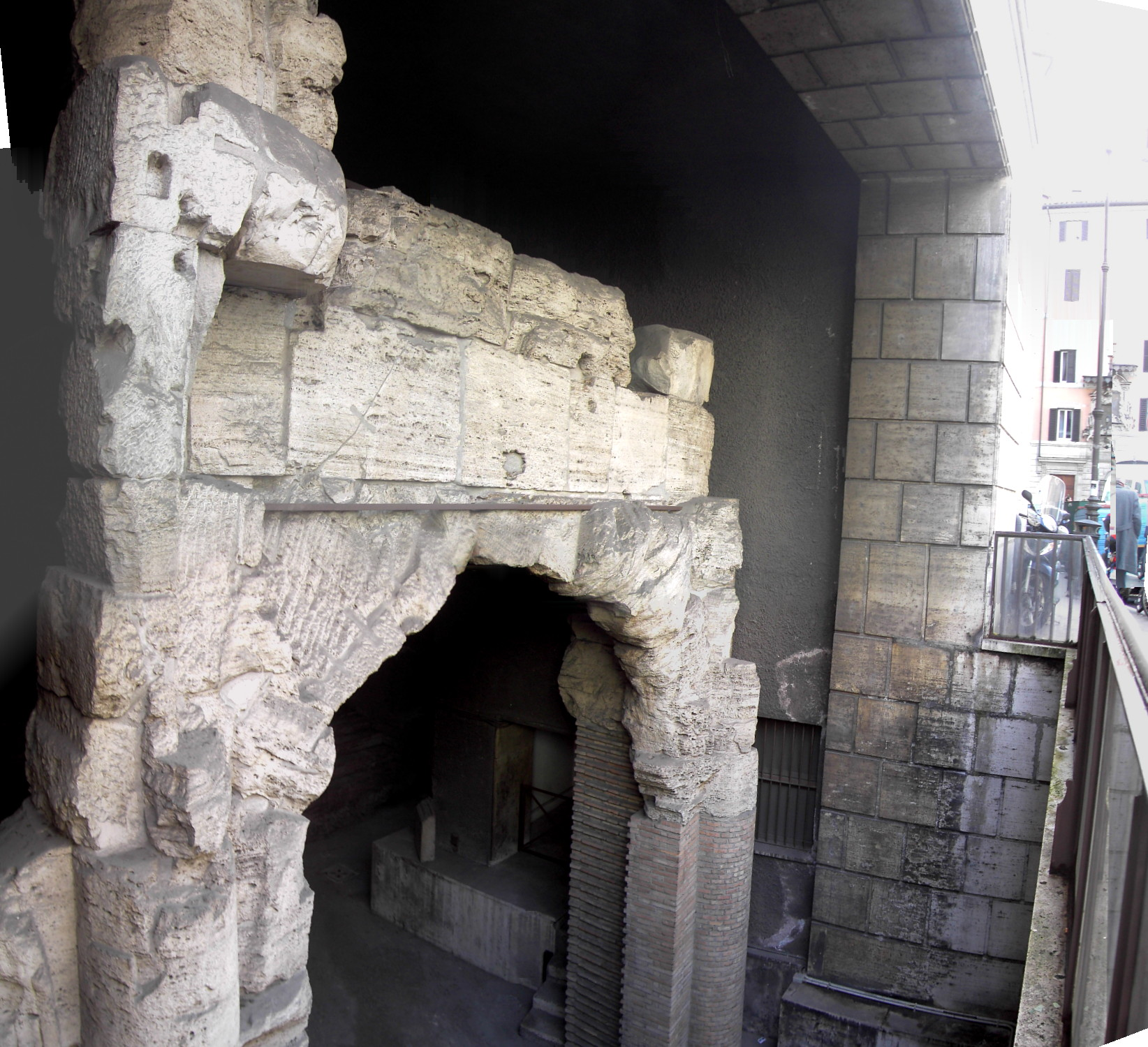
- Northern entrance arch of the Stadium of Domitian

- Shown within Augustan Rome
- Interactive map of Stadium of Domitian
- 41°53′56″N 12°28′23″E
- Type: Stadium
- Location: Regio IX Circus Flaminius

History
- Built: AD 80
- Built by: Domitian

The Stadium of Domitian (Italian: Stadio di Domiziano), also known as the Circus Agonalis, was located under the present Piazza Navona which follows its outline and incorporates its remains, to the north of the ancient Campus Martius in Rome, Italy. The Stadium was commissioned around AD 80 by Emperor Titus Flavius Domitianus as a gift to the people of Rome and was used almost entirely for athletic contests. In Christian tradition, Agnes of Rome was martyred there.

== History ==
=== Construction and design ===
The Stadium of Domitian was dedicated in AD 86, as part of an Imperial building programme on the Campus Martius and elsewhere, following the damage or destruction of most of its buildings by fire in AD 79. It was Rome's first permanent venue for competitive athletics, erected for Domitian's celebration of the Capitoline Games. It was patterned after Greek stadia and seated approximately 30,000. The substructures and support frames were made of brick and concrete – a robust, fire-retardant and relatively cheap material – clad in marble. Stylistically, the Stadium facades would have resembled those of the Colosseum; the floor plan was typical of Greek stadia, having a similarly semi-circular end. Colini (1943) estimates the total stadium length as approximately 275 metres, and the total width as 106 metres, while later sources give the height of its outer perimeter benches as 30 m (100 ft) above ground level and its inner perimeter benches as 4.5 m (15 ft) above the arena floor. This arrangement offered a clear view of the track from most seats. The typically Greek layout gave the Stadium its Latinised Greek name, in agones (the place or site of the competitions). The flattened end was sealed by two vertically staggered entrance galleries and the perimeter was arcaded beneath the seating levels, with travertine pilasters between its cavea (enclosures). The formation of a continuous arena trackway by a raised "spina" or strip has been conjectured.

The Stadium of Domitian was the northernmost of a series of public buildings on Campus Martius at that time. To its south stood the smaller and more intimate Odeon of Domitian, used for recitals, songs and orations. The southernmost end of the Campus was dominated by the Theatre of Pompey, restored by Domitian during the same rebuilding program.

=== Uses ===
The Stadium was used almost entirely for athletic contests. For "a few years", following fire damage to the Colosseum in AD 217, it was used for gladiator shows. According to the Historia Augusta's garish account of Emperor Elagabalus, the arcades were used as brothels and the emperor Severus Alexander funded his restoration of the Stadium partly with tax-revenue from the latter. In Christian martyr-legend, St Agnes was put to death there during the reign of the emperor Diocletian, in or near one of its arcades. With the economic and political crises of the later Imperial and post-Imperial eras, the Stadium seems to have fallen out of its former use; the arcades provided living quarters for the poor and the arena a meeting place. It may have been densely populated: "With the decline of the city after the barbarian invasions, the rapidly dwindling population gradually abandoned the surrounding hills and was concentrated in the campus Martius, which contained the main part of Rome until the new developments in the nineteenth century." Substantial portions of the structure survived into the Renaissance era, when they were mined and robbed for building materials.

=== Legacy ===
The Piazza Navona sits over the interior arena of the Stadium. The sweep of buildings that embrace the Piazza incorporates the Stadium's original lower arcades. They include the most recent rebuilding of the Church of Sant'Agnese in Agone, first founded in the ninth century at the traditional place of St. Agnes' martyrdom.

== See also ==
- Theatre of Marcellus – Ancient Roman theater in Rome
- List of ancient monuments in Rome

== Notes ==
Preceded by Gardens of Sallust	Landmarks of Rome; Stadium of Domitian	Succeeded by Theatre of Marcellus
