= Porticus Octaviae =

Ancient Roman structure

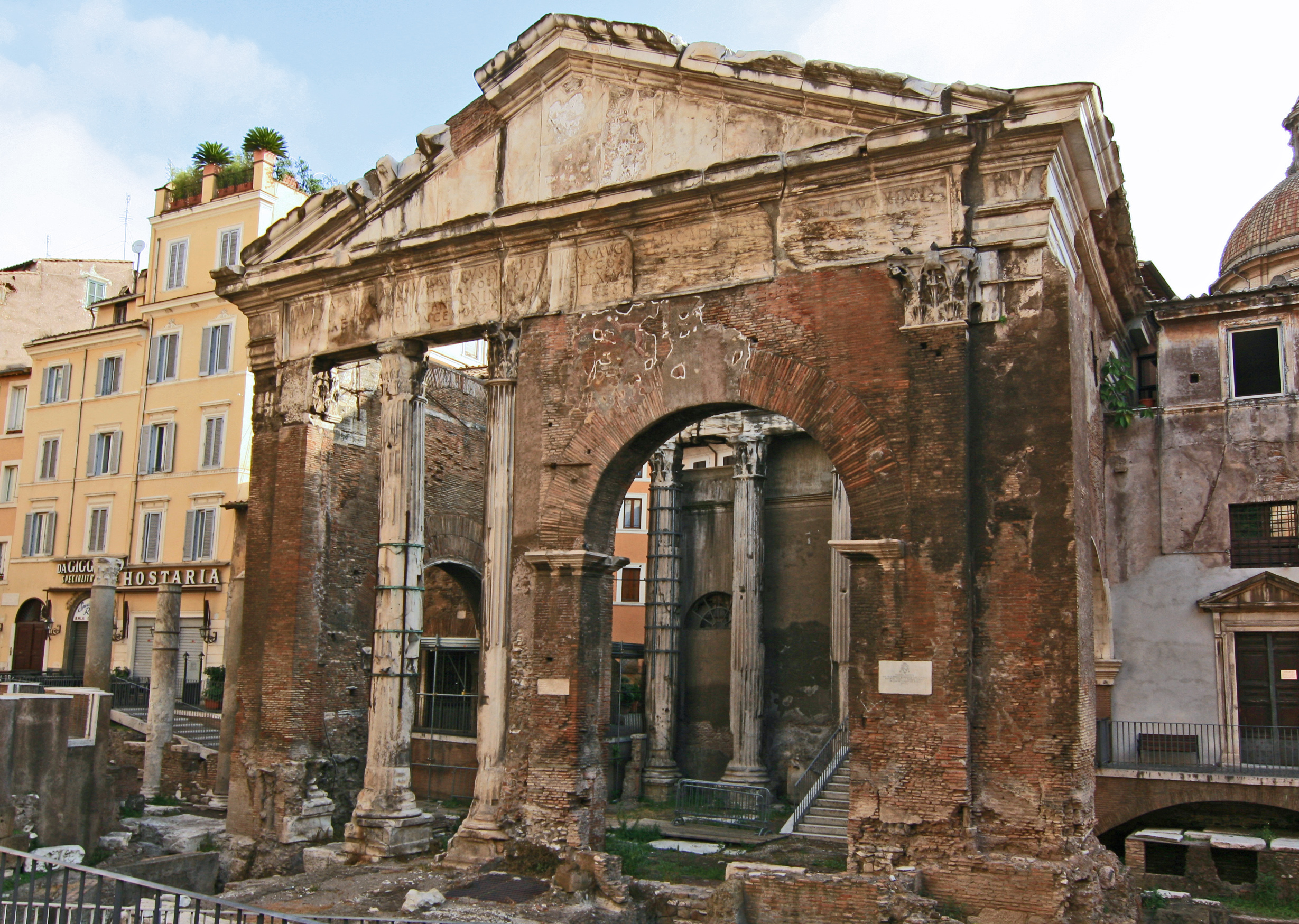
- The Porticus Octaviae in modern times

- Shown within Augustan Rome
- Interactive map of Porticus Octaviae
- 41°53′33″N 12°28′43″E
- Location: Regio IX Circus Flaminius

History
- Built: Imperial periods
- Built by: Augustus

The Porticus Octaviae (English: Porticus of Octavia; Italian: Portico di Ottavia) is an ancient structure in Rome, Italy. The colonnaded walks of the portico enclosed the Temples of Juno Regina (north) and Jupiter Stator (south), as well as a library. The structure was used as a fish market from the medieval period up to the end of the 19th century.

== History ==
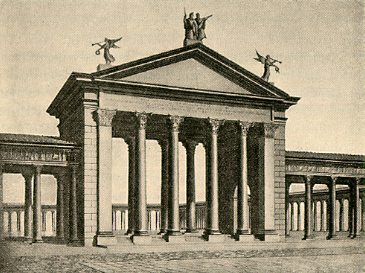
Main gate

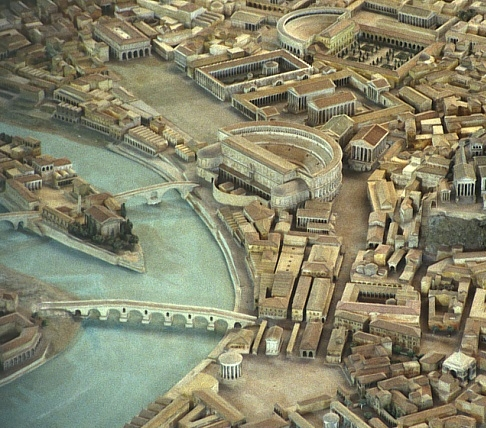
The Porticus Octaviae behind the Theater of Marcellus in Gismondi's model, Museum of Roman Civilization

After celebrating his triumph for his 146 BC victory at Scarpheia during the Achaean War, Quintus Caecilius Metellus Macedonicus constructed a portico around M. Aemilius Lepidus's Temple of Juno Regina, near the Circus Flaminius in the southern Campus Martius and erected a new Temple of Jupiter Stator beside it. He decorated both with equestrian statues of Alexander the Great's generals brought back from Greece. This portico was known as the Portico of Metellus (Porticus Metelli) or Portico of Caecilius (Porticus Caecilii).

Augustus refurbished the portico and its temples and rededicated it to his sister Octavia the Younger sometime after 27 BC. Cassius Dio stated that this was done in 33 BC from the spoils of the war in Dalmatia out of confusion with the adjacent Portico of Octavius (Porticus Octavia), which was similarly refurbished and rededicated by Augustus and his stepbrother L. Marcius Philippus. Besides the temples, the portico included a Greek and Latin library erected by Octavia in memory of her son Marcus Claudius Marcellus, an assembly hall (Curia Octaviae), and lecture rooms (scholae). Whether these were different parts of one building or entirely different structures is uncertain. The Roman Senate met in the curia. The whole is referred to by Pliny the Elder as the works of Octavia (Octaviae opera).

The portico and its buildings burned in AD 80 and were restored, probably by Domitian. After a second fire in 203, they were restored by Septimius Severus and Caracalla. It was adorned with foreign marble and contained many famous works of art, enumerated in Pliny's Natural History. The structure was damaged by an earthquake in 442 when two of the destroyed columns were replaced with an archway that still stands. The church of Sant'Angelo in Pescheria was built on its ruins c. 770, the name commemorating the portico's medieval and early modern role as a fish market. The building, which lies in the Sant'Angelo rione, represented the center of the medieval Roman Ghetto.

== See also ==
- List of ancient monuments in Rome

Preceded by Portico Dii Consentes	Landmarks of Rome; Porticus Octaviae	Succeeded by Tabularium
