= Temple of Fortuna Equestris =

The Temple of Fortuna Equestris (Latin: aedes Fortunae Equestris) was a temple dedicated to the goddess Fortuna in ancient Rome. Its precise location is unknown, though Vitruvius states it stood near the Theatre of Pompey. By 22 AD, there was no temple dedicated to Fortuna Equestris in Rome – it was likely destroyed some time before then; possibly by the fire that burned the Theatre of Pompey in 21 AD.

The temple was built by Quintus Fulvius Flaccus in 180 BC, in fulfilment of a vow to the goddess in exchange for her support during his campaign in Hispania. 'Equestris' refers to the equites, then seen as key to Roman victories. Flaccus dedicated it in 173 BC, when he was censor. Flaccus had much of the marble roof of the Temple of Juno Lacinia in Kroton brought to Rome for use in the temple. Outraged by the action, the senate ordered him to send the roof back to Kroton and restore the temple he had damaged.

== See also ==
- List of Ancient Roman temples
