= Campus Martius =

Public space in ancient Rome

Coordinates: 41.8978°N 12.4772°E

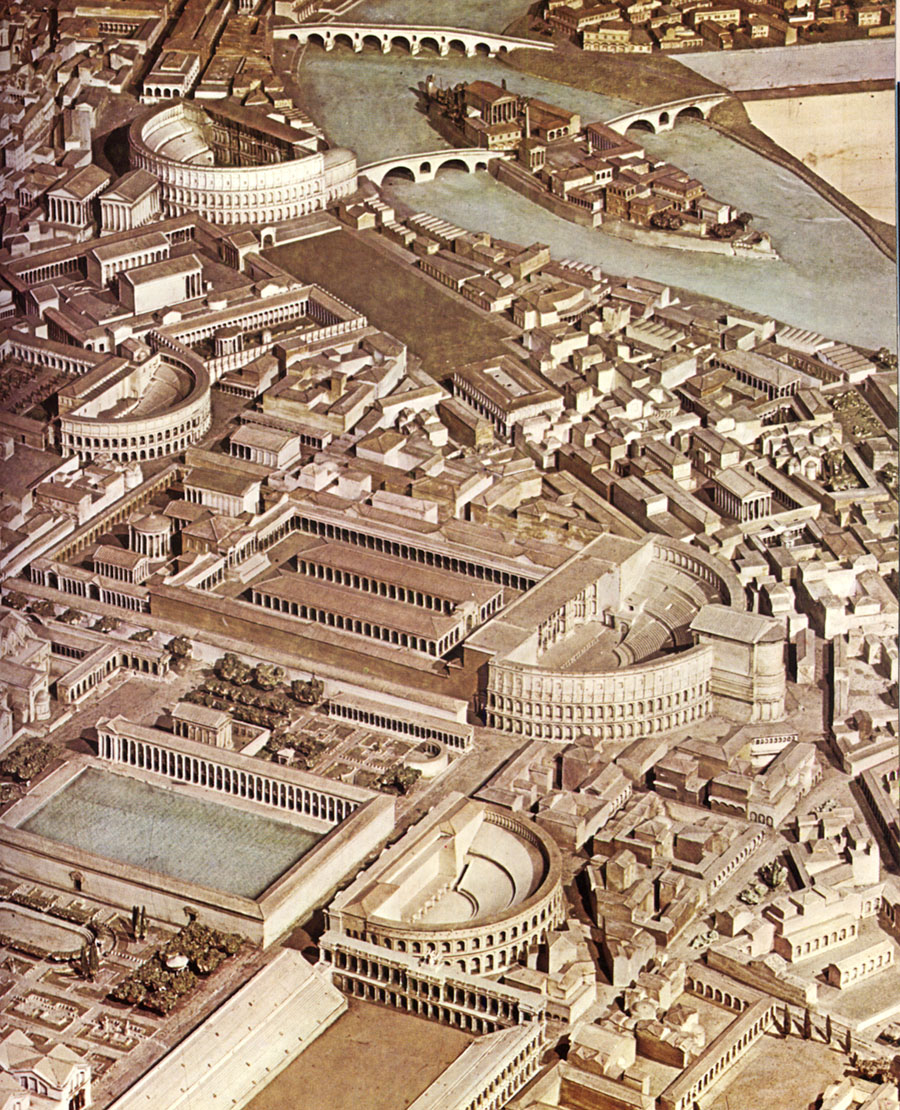
Model of the ancient Campus Martius, seen near the lower left of the picture, around AD 300. When the Assembly of the Centuries used to vote on the Field of Mars in the Roman Old Republic, it had been an area outside the Pomerium, the exact boundaries of which have not been preserved. By this time, however, it was a perfectly rectangular field, surrounded by buildings very much inside the city proper.

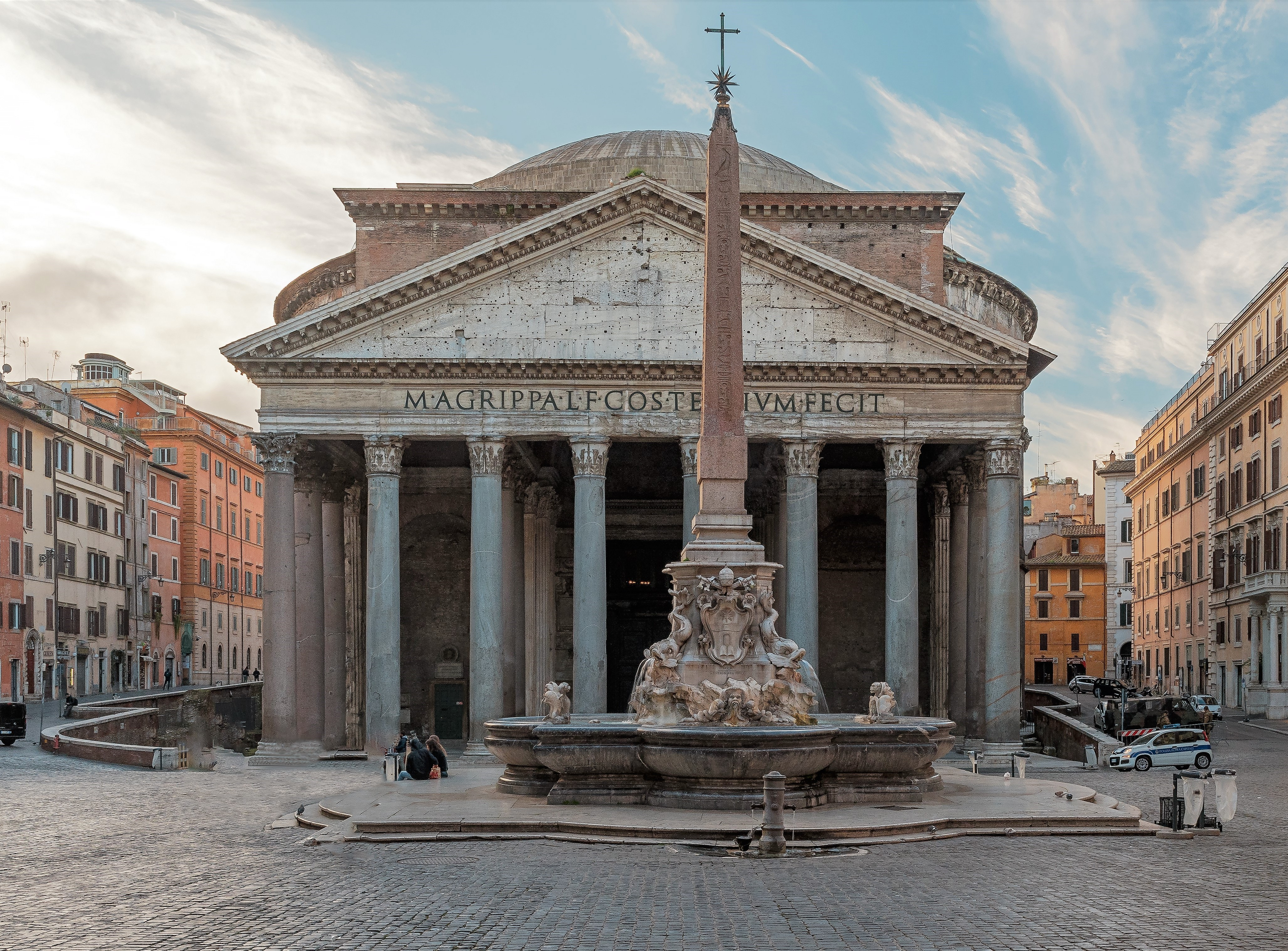
The Pantheon and the Fontana del Pantheon, a landmark of the Campus Martius since ancient Rome

The Campus Martius (Latin for 'Field of Mars'; Italian: Campo Marzio) was a publicly owned area of ancient Rome about 2 square kilometres (490 acres) in extent. In the Middle Ages, it was the most populous area of Rome. The IV rione of Rome, Campo Marzio, which covers a smaller section of the original area, bears the same name.

== Antiquity ==
According to Rome's foundation myth, prior to the founding of the city, Rhea Silvia had her twin sons, Romulus and Remus, taken by the King of Alba Longa. The boys were later discarded in the swelling Tiber River, which would later run along the Campus' western boundary. Washing ashore further downriver, the brothers would return decades later to found a new city. Romulus, who became Rome's sole king (after killing his brother Remus), ruled for many years until sometime in the seventh century B.C. As he came to the end of his life, a storm cloud descended upon the center of the open field outside the city's pomerium in order to lift the elderly king to the afterlife.

This land, "between the city and the Tiber", became the property of Rome's last Etruscan king, Tarquinius Superbus. After his defeat and exile, the plain was dedicated to the god Mars. Roman men assembled every spring before heading off to fight the hostile tribes that surrounded Rome, and citizens gathered for important religious festivals. With the exception of a small altar to Mars near the center of the field, no visible changes were made to the field until the fifth century B.C.

In 435 B.C., the Villa Publica was established in a prepared 300-meter clearing. The area was a gathering space for citizens to congregate every five years to be counted in a census, but had no permanent structures; no additions would be made for another two centuries.

With the advent of the Punic Wars in the mid-third century B.C., Roman military expansion moved out of the Italian peninsula, resulting in the reduction of seasonal musters on the field. The number of foreign wars, however, greatly increased the amount of wealth flowing into Rome. Generals who had sworn to various deities to build temples in their honor if victorious used the vast amounts of wealth to fund these construction projects. Besides temples and wooden markets, entertainment venues were built as well, though they were to be temporary.

Starting in the time of Sulla, building lots were sold or granted to influential Romans, and insulae (apartment blocks) and villas encroached on the common land. It later became the place for comitia centuriata, civic meetings with weapons, and for the city's militia. In 55 BC, Pompey constructed a permanent theater, the Theatrum Pompeium, the first stone theater in Rome. When the Curia Hostilia burned down in 52 BC, the theater was sometimes used as a meeting place for the Senate. The area was also used as the assembling ground for elections. Julius Caesar planned for the Saepta (enclosures used for elections) to be placed there; they were later completed by his heir Augustus (Octavian). In 33 BC, Octavian dedicated the Porticus Octaviae, built from spoils of the Roman-Dalmatian War.

During the Augustan period of the early Roman Empire, the area became officially part of the city: Rome was split into 14 regions, and the Campus Martius was divided into the VII Via Lata on the east and the IX Circus Flaminius nearer to the river. The Campus Martius also held the Ara Pacis (Altar of Peace), built by the Senate to mark the establishment of peace by Augustus. It was intended to symbolize the successful completion of Augustus' efforts to stabilize the Empire. Marcus Agrippa had the original swampy ground made into a pool and baths in a setting of parkland and temples, the Laconicum Sudatorium or Baths of Agrippa. Also, he built the Porticus Argonautarum and the Pantheon, which was later rebuilt by Hadrian as it still stands today. In 19 BC, he also completed the Aqua Virgo, to supply water to these new baths and fountains.

In the non-populated northern area was the huge Mausoleum of Augustus. Other buildings that were made were the Theatre of Marcellus, the Temple for Isis (from around the time of Caligula), the baths and bridge by Nero, and Pompey's theatre, where Julius Caesar was murdered by Marcus Brutus and his allies. After the fire of 80 A.D., Domitian rebuilt the burnt monuments plus a stadium (eventually to become today's Piazza Navona) and an Odeion (a small performance hall). In 119 A.D, reinforcing the themes of imperial divinity and apotheosis established by Augustus, Hadrian and the succeeding Antonines added a temple to Hadrian's mother-in-law, the Divine Matidia, and a temple to the Divine Hadrian himself built by Antoninus Pius.

As was the case with the first two Flavian and Antonine emperors, the Severans did not commit many resources to construction projects in an already crowded Campus Martius. Their interests lay elsewhere in repairs and commissioning new structures in other regions of the capital. The Campus did not see another major architectural change until the reign of Aurelian.

The citizens of Rome took great pride in knowing that Rome required no fortifications because of the stability brought by the Pax Romana under the protection of the Roman Army. In 270 A.D., however, barbarian tribes flooded across the Germanic frontier and reached northern Italy as the Roman army struggled to stop them. To alleviate the city's vulnerability, the emperor ordered the construction of a 19-kilometer-long, 6 to 8-meter-high brick wall, fortified with defensive turrets, named the Aurelian Walls. Aurelian did not live to see his work completed under his successor Probus, in 276 A.D. With the completion of the walls, the Campus Martius was finally incorporated into the rest of the city.

By the mid-fourth century, when emperor Constantius II visited Rome, now the former capital, many of the pagan temples were closed. Buildings dedicated to Christianity began to occupy their spaces. Some were reduced to supporting material, some were razed, and some were given new roles, such as the Pantheon. In 663 A.D. its bronze roof tiles were removed and replaced with lead, an act that Gregorius said was the result of "excessive avarice and the 'excessive greed for gold.'" In the fifth century, Rome was burned and sacked twice: by the Visigoths in 410 A.D. and by the Vandals in 455 A.D. Three earthquakes racked the city between 408 and 508 A.D, and two floods washed over low-lying spaces in 398 and 411 A.D. Many marble facings and columns were tossed into kilns to be burned into lime powder for reuse.

Writing in the twelfth or thirteenth century, Magister Gregorius, marveled at those edifices in the Field of Mars whose antiquity was clear but whose names were not as certain. Looking down from the heights of one of Rome's hills, he recorded that the great structures had been replaced by a "forest of [medieval] towers". In 1581, French essayist Michel de Montaigne traveled to Rome and noted that "upon the very wrecks of the ancient buildings, as they fall to ruin, the builders set out casually the foundations of new houses, as if these fragments were great masses of rock, firm and trustworthy. It is evident that many of the old streets lie more than thirty feet below the level of those now in existence."

== Geography ==
The Campus Martius was located not in the city proper, but north of the Capitoline Hill. Until the imperial era, most of the region lay outside of the pomerium. The field covered an area of about 250 hectares, or 600 acres, extending a little more than two kilometres north and south from the Capitoline to the porta Flaminia, and a little less than two kilometers east and west in its widest part, between the Quirinal and the river. It was low, from 10 to 15 metres above the level of the sea in antiquity, now 13 to 20, and from 3 to 8 above that of the Tiber, and of course subject to frequent inundations. Ancient writers say that there were several recognizable natural points, such as an oak grove north of the Tiber Island and the Palus Caprae, in the center of the space.

== Significance ==
In Latin, Campus Martius means "Field of Mars", a god highly considered in the Roman pantheon. Paul W. Jacobs III attributes the significance of Mars to his patronage of both military and agriculture. In the calendar year, March was the month named after Mars: this month first marked the beginning of when the consuls started to work until 153 BC.

The Campus Martius may have been named after the Ara Martis ("Mars' altar"), which was talked about starting in the eighth century BC. It is not known exactly when the Ara Martis was built or when it was destroyed.

The social climate and events surrounding Campus Martius were significant to Roman culture. Livy describes a horse race called the second Equirria, which started on March 14. The winning horse was killed and sacrificed to Mars.

The second event used to support his claim was the Anna Perenna. This event was when the plebs would go out to Campus Martius to eat and drink. The reason why Anna Perenna was important was because she was an ugly hag and she represented the end of a year, and Mars represented the nice beginning of the year.

The last event Jacobs II talks about is the Tubilustrium festival, which purified military instruments to summon the cruciate assemblies. This celebration used to validate the emperors' imperium, but later on the festival validated the consuls imperium.

== Architecture ==
The style and structure of Campus Martius architecture went through several stages of development between the 6th century BC through Late Antiquity. It is virtually impossible to pinpoint exactly when and why these stages occurred, but some historians have sectionalized different periods where Roman architecture faced relatively significant transformation.

=== Regal Rome and early Republic ===
Between the mid-6th century BC and the end of the early Republic (324 BC) four temples were built. These were Temple of Diana [6th century], Temple of Castor and Pollux [495 BC], Temple of Apollo Sosianus [431 BC] and Temple of Juno Regina [392 BC]. Of these four structures, many view the Temple of Diana (Rome) as semi-legendary since it lacks enough sustainable evidence to prove its existence. The reason these two periods are combined as one is because there is minimal certainty on the structure and style of these temples. The reason for this, out of probability, is because the material used at the time was neither concrete, stone or marble, materials that are sustainable longer term and not only that but over two centuries there is certainly the risk of the destruction of these temples.

=== Hellenistic Age ===
After the death of Alexander the Great in 324 BC or the beginning of the "wave of Hellenism" there was a drastic increase in terms building construction within the city of Rome. In the case of Campus Martius, specifically during the "wave of Hellenism", there were seven temples built. These new temples constructed were as follows; Temple of Bellona [296 BC], Temple of Fortuna [293 BC], Temple of Juturna [241 BC], Temple of Hercules [221 BC], Temple of Vulcan [214 BC) and Temple of Fortuna Equestris [173 BC]. The one temple excluded on that prior list is a temple built between 190 BC and 179 BC. It is uncertain if this temple was as Cicero writes, the “Temple of Nymphs”, or as other sources believe the “Temple of the Lares Permarini.

This period of Hellenism was the first major step in which the Roman temples, as well as the temples found in Campus Martius were generally made of stone architecture. This new style was in a way, a step up from the simpler early forms, which often appear coarse and bulky in comparison to the aesthetic perfection and refinement of the later structures. This period a transformation occurred from simple experimentation to the strict mathematical complexity of ground plans and superstructures. The Hellenistic Period was not only an expansion in terms of temples numerically within the Campus Martius, but also a stylistic transformation.

=== Late Republic and early Empire ===
Similar to the Hellenistic Period, the Late Republic and Early Empire was also a period of several construction projects within the Campus Martius. This period, chronologically, began at the end of the third and final Punic War and lasted until the end of the Julio-Claudian Dynasty in 65 AD. During this period there were six temples built in Campus Martius. They were the Temple of Jupiter Stator [146 BC], the Temple of Feronia [Pre-100 BC], the Temple of Neptunus [97 BC], the Temple of Isis and Serapis [43 BC] and the Temple of Mars Ultor [2 BC]. The one temple excluded from this list is the Temple of Minerva Chalcidica. The reason for this exclusion is because it is unknown whether this temple was built by Pompey in 60 BC or built by Augustus in 29 BC. Certain sources support the belief that Dion Cassius attributes this temple to Augustus: "Temple of Minerva, which was called Chalcidicum” Unlike the structural and stylistic transformation from Regal Period to the Hellenistic Period the temples in the Campus Martius were rather consistent. The main reason that these two periods are separated is because the motivation or reasoning for building these temples changed. In the past these temples were more commonly than not, an attribute to certain individuals for their past success by fellow patrons, but following the end of the Hellenistic period these temples became more of political instruments than ever before. Instead of being merely genuine and slightly political “donations” that exemplified the successful of individuals, these temples in Campus Martius now were expected to trigger propaganda values whenever large architectural projects took place.

=== Roman Empire ===
Alongside Rome, temples built within the Campus Martius faced a “fundamental change in stylistic direction” during the latter half of the first century on. This was a period when the sculptures and linear forms of the classical past was first firmly challenged by the canopied volume of the future. This was a historical period for Roman architecture in that, the catalyst for architects to embrace concrete as a design material or as Nero describes it break free from “the shackles of the classical past”. For possibly the first time Campus Martius and all of Rome faced a period where they moved away from the classical ways of architecture.

== Monuments and historical architectural discrepancies ==
=== "Horologium Augusti" ===
Before the 1980s, the reconstruction of the obelisk and its usage were erroneous. Prior to that era, Buchner's paper and reconstruction of the obelisk was blindly believed and deemed as accurate. His reconstruction was arguing that the obelisk with the gnomon on top of it was used as a sundial, using the sun's shadow's reflection to keep track of the hours of the day. Furthermore, Buchner argued that the sundial was integrated into the design of the Ara Pacis in a way that the shadow cast directly onto the altar on Augustus’s birthday. The sundial was also integrated in the design of the Mausoleum of Augustus in such a way which illustrated that the entire complex was a cosmic representation of the Principate and the destiny of Augustus, along with his peaceful reign and death.

In the mid-1980s, Schutz and Bandini challenged the erroneous reconstruction. Bandini found several mistakes made by Buchner on interpreting the ancient texts written by Pliny. Pliny referred to a solar meridian, not a sundial. A solar meridian indicates the length of days and nights, therefore reflecting the timing of the solstices. It was used as an instrument to check the congruence of the civil calendar with the solar year. Further archeological findings where a travertine pavement embedded with a line running north to south with Greek lettering in bronze with zodiac signs confirmed Pliny's writing. Also, the fact that the site was measured to be about a meter too high to be considered of Augustan date, therefore indicated that the instrument built under Augustus lost its accuracy and was renovated by Domitian.

Schutz then highlighted some technical failures further refuting the previous reconstruction, such as: The erroneous marking of the site where the obelisk lay, the mislabeling of the angles for the relationship between the three monuments and the fact that the gnomon's shadow would cast several football fields away from the obelisk due to the sun's angle.

It is worth noting, however, that even after those findings, the relevance and the cosmic meaning of the obelisk and the two other monuments constructed under Augustus's reign remain correct. The importance of Augustus's reign is supported by the evidence that Domitian decided to renovate the instrument and keep it dedicated to Augustus.

=== The Ara Pacis ===
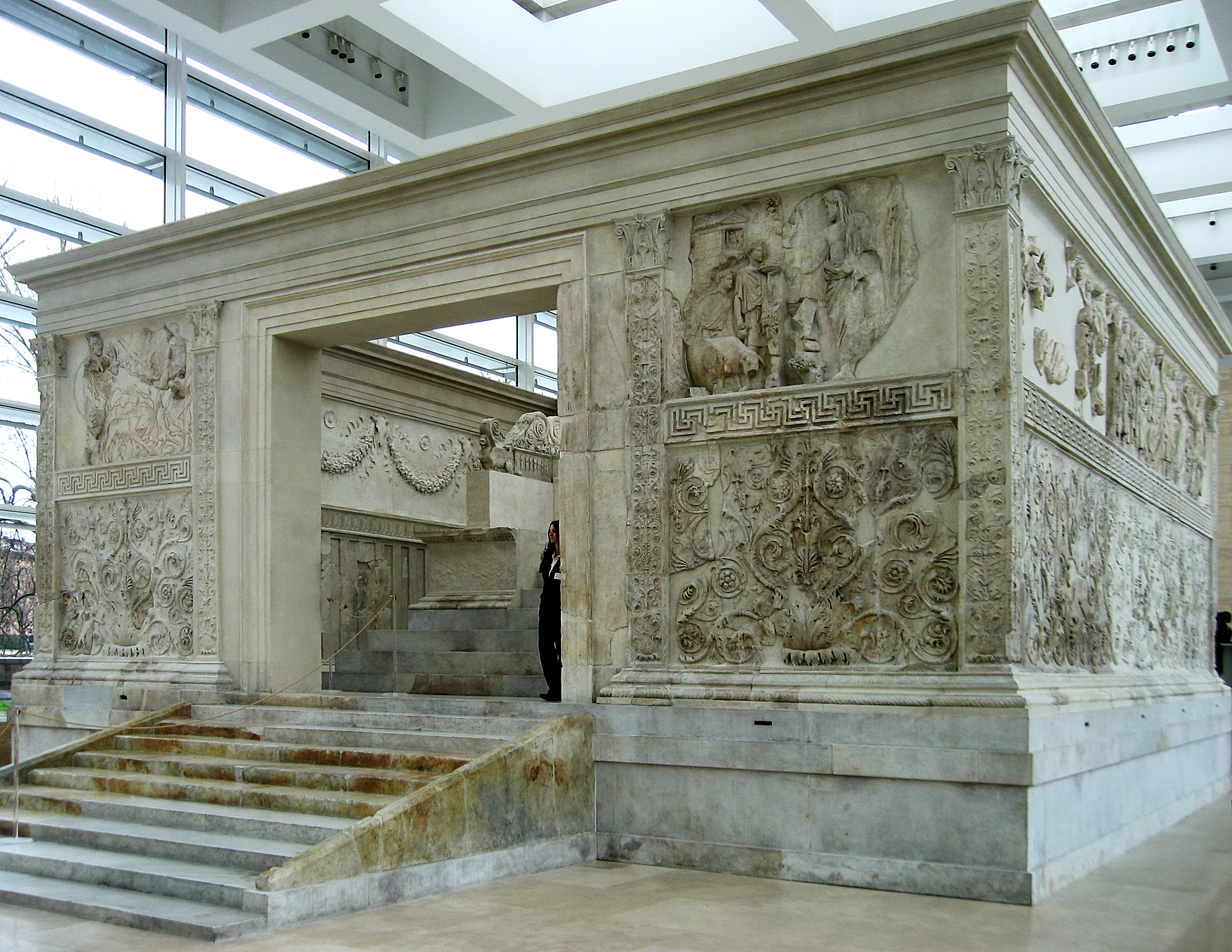
Ara Pacis Augustae, the "Altar of Augustan Peace", as reassembled

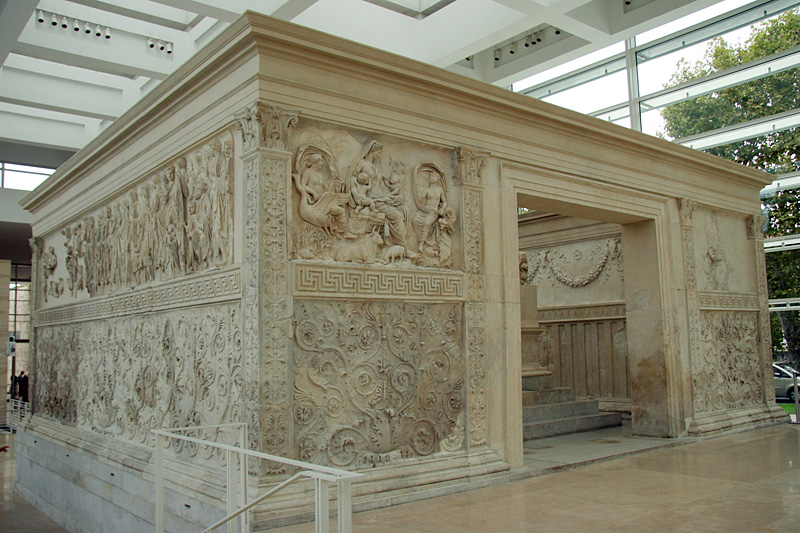
View of the opposite side Tellus Panel at the left and Roma Panel at the right

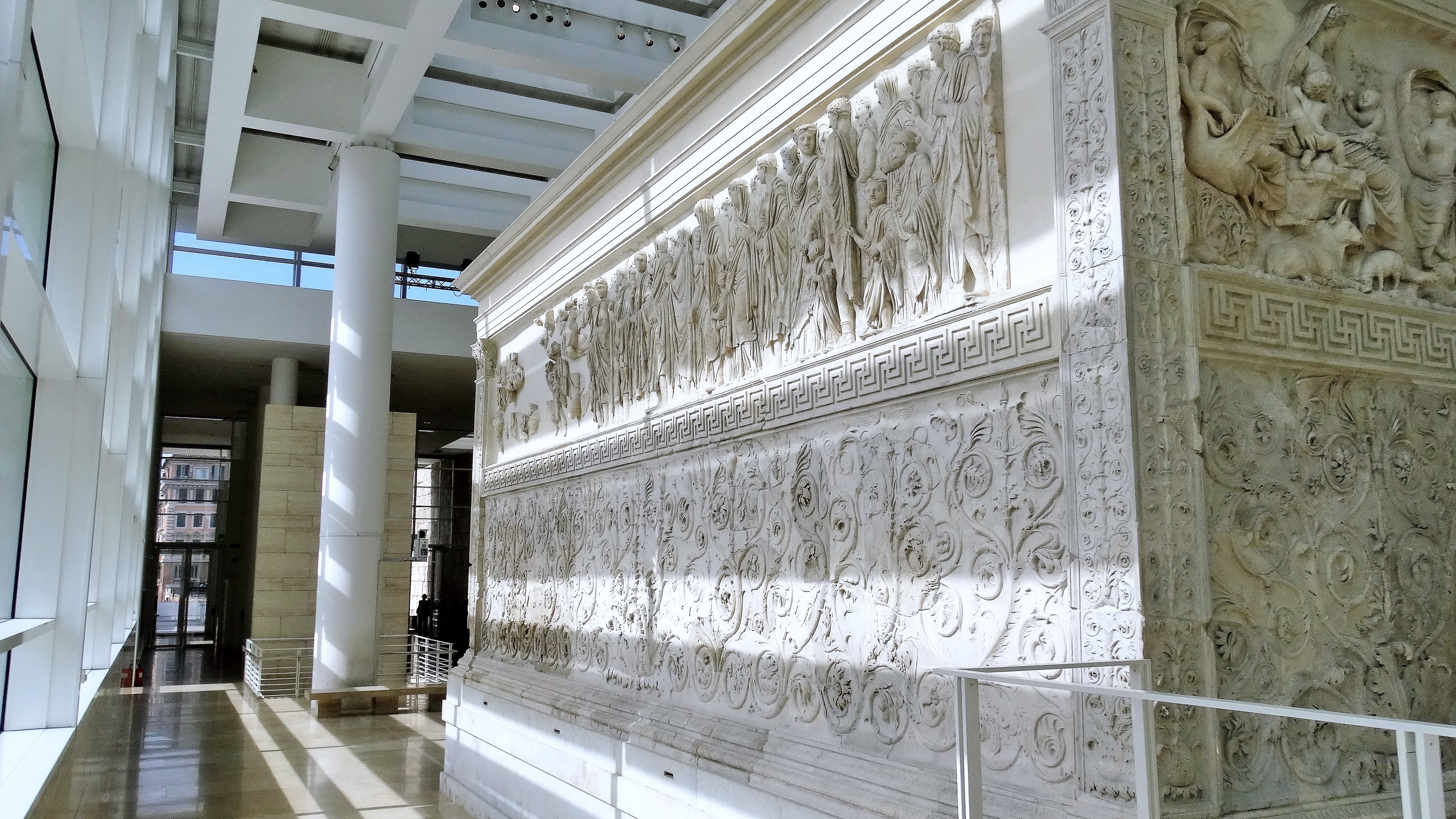
View of the other wall of the Ara Pacis

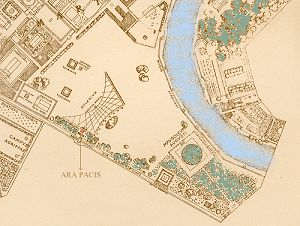
Map showing the original location of the Ara Pacis

The Ara Pacis is an altar that was built during the reign of Augustus; begun in 13 BCE, the monument was dedicated in 9 BCE, on Livia's birthday. Altars were used for sacrifices to Pagan Gods in Ancient Rome. The Ara Pacis represented Augustus' goal to represent the era of peace that came with the end of the Republic and the beginning of the Empire. The south panel depicts a religious process with Augustus, Agrippa, Livia, Tiberius, and others of the Augustan family. The message conveyed was that the Augustan family was to stand the test of time and stay. The north panel depicted the senate in a procession. The message was that the senate was with Augustus instead of against him. The east panel depicts Tellus, the Roman Goddess of the earth and Pax. The message was that Roman people were no longer starving, which was consistent with Augustus’ promise of “peace and fertility”, where he gave land to farmers to plant in the fall and harvest in the spring. The west panel depicts the sacrifice of either Aeneas, the founder of Rome or Numa Pompilius the second king of Rome, it is also where the entrance is located.

=== Architectural significance ===
The steps leading up to the table on top of the altar represent the ascendence from a public space to a sacred one. Also, the fact that the Ara Pacis did not have a roof or doors and that Gods were depicted looking down from the friezes indicated that the person undertaking vows was looked down upon. When the Senate decreed the building of the Ara Pacis for Augustus, they did not specify any restrictions to the architects. The architects in Ancient Rome used to draw plans with dimensions in proportions and ratios; for instance, the enclosure's size and the number of steps were all specific ratios related to the size of the base. The Ara Pacis’ eclectic art leads us to believe that components might have come from other altars in other provinces most likely salvaged on the troops’ way back to Rome.

=== Historical discrepancies ===
Before Andersen's studies, it was assumed that the monument's structure was more or less unchanged between its erection and dedication. Andersen relied on evidence from Ovid's Fasti and the “Calendar of the Feasts” which depicts Augustus as Pontifex Maximus, a status that he achieved in 12 BCE; his return from the provinces as victor was celebrated with a massive feast during which, as depicted by Ovid, a white bull was slaughtered. But such a feast could not have taken place in the “complete” Ara Pacis; the elevated area was much too small for such a large gathering. Andersen makes a point that the feast actually took place on the foundation of the Ara Pacis, which was then called Ara Fortunae Reducis; at that time, this was simply a plinth on a step base. After Lepidus’ death and Augustus' election as Pontifex Maximus, the building of the complete Ara Pacis began; steps were carved into the plinth, a table was put on top, and friezes were carved onto panels affixed to the walls. Evidence of this historical discrepancy was made evident by Gatti's reconstruction plans, which contrasted with Moretti's in the lack of moldings for the steps.

== Augustus' rise to power through building on Campus Martius ==
A large portion of events occurring on Campus Martius were associated with either Roman military or Roman electoral or political activities. On it, troops trained for war, and successful generals displayed their riches taken from conquered lands, erecting temples and public buildings to impress the Roman populace in order to curry favor in the elections. In the 30s and 20s B.C.E Rome was experiencing unparalleled growth in public building projects sponsored by many different leading men in the Roman State. In Rome, the sponsorship of these public buildings provided special prestige to each of the individual builders and their families. Augustus, however, expanded past receiving simple prestige, in favor of a much more powerful role. Augustus was amongst numerous builders during the time, but by focusing on the construction of buildings to hold political functions, Augustus was able to occupy a central place in Rome's political atmosphere. The first building on Campus Martius to be associated with Augustus was the Saepta Julia, which was designed to manage the crowds at elections and prevent fraud. Voters would gather in the pen space north of the Saepta and enter the structure on its northern end, where they would then cast their ballots. Marcus Vipsanius Agrippa completed the Saepta Julia and dedicated it in honor of Augustus. The Pantheon, which was also built by Agrippa and associated with Augustus, was completed within a year of the Saepta Julia and was used for pre-election functions. Agrippa tried to name the Pantheon after Augustus but was denied, instead he erected a statue of Augustus, Julius Caesar and himself in the porch of the Pantheon, forever associating the Pantheon with Augustus, Julius Caesar and Agrippa. So when the crowds gathered to listen to speeches concerning important political events, they did so in buildings dedicated to Augustus, automatically drawing the connection between Augustus and important Roman politics. All of the sites built specifically to host political activities, meetings of the Senate and both legislative and electoral assemblies, were sponsored by or closely associated with Augustus. The ancient Roman historian Strabo describes the presence Augustus left throughout Campus Martius:

In fact, Pompey, the Deified Caesar, Augustus, his sons and friends, and wife and sister, have outdone all others in their zeal for buildings and in the expense incurred. The Campus Martius contains most of these, and thus, in addition to its natural beauty, it has received still further adornment as the result of foresight. Indeed, the size of the Campus is remarkable, since it affords space at the same time and without interference, not only for the chariot-races and every other equestrian exercise, but also for all that multitude of people who exercise themselves by ball-playing, hoop-trundling, and wrestling; and the works of art situated around the Campus Martius, and the ground, which is covered with grass throughout the year, and the crowns of those hills that are above the river and extend as far as its bed, which present to the eye the appearance of a stage-painting — all this, I say, affords a spectacle that one can hardly draw away from. For this reason, in the belief that this place was holiest of all, the Romans have erected in it the tombs of their most illustrious men and women. The most noteworthy is what is called the Mausoleum, a great mound near the river on a lofty foundation of white marble, thickly covered with ever-green trees to the very summit. Now on top is a bronze image of Augustus Caesar; beneath the mound are the tombs of himself and his kinsmen and intimates; behind the mound is a large sacred precinct with wonderful promenades; and in the centre of the Campus is the wall (this too of white marble) round his crematorium; the wall is surrounded by a circular iron fence and the space within the wall is planted with black poplars. Such is Rome.

As this series of architectural changes occurred following Augustus’ defeat of Mark Antony, Augustus’ association with the new political buildings furthered his rise to political power and status in Rome. Years of civil war from The Great Roman Civil War (49–45 BC) to the Final War of the Roman Republic (32–30 BC) had left Rome in a state of near lawlessness, but the Republic was not prepared to accept the control of Augustus just yet. At the same time Augustus could not give up his authority without risking further civil wars among other Roman generals, and even if he desired no political position, it was his duty to look after the well-being of Rome and Roman provinces. Augustus’ aims from this point forward was to return Rome to a state a stability and civility by lifting the political pressure imposed on the courts of law and ensuring free elections in name at least. Not only did Augustus return the Senate and popular assemblies to their former role, his new buildings on Campus Martius provided the Senate and assemblies with new political homes, all of which were closely associated with Augustus. By willingly restoring the Roman Senate and popular assemblies to their former role and building several monumental politically focused buildings throughout Campus Martius, Augustus permanently connected himself with Rome's political atmosphere.

== Religious buildings ==
In the Campus Martius, many public monuments had a religious significance, as they were temples to various gods that were absorbed into the Roman culture. One of the biggest monuments is the temple of Mars Ultor (the avenger) dedicated to Mars, the god of War. It is in the Forum Augustum and is Augustus's most ambitious architectural building. The construction started in 30BC and took three decades. The exterior of the temple was constructed using the Italian white Luna marble from Carrara and the columns reflect the Corinthians style. The architecture is strongly influenced by the Temple of Jupiter Capitolinus in terms of its dimensions (36 meters wide and its length is 50 meters. It was also a political entity aimed at magnifying Augustus role in avenging Caesar’s assassination.

Some of the most significant temples of the campus are the rectangular temples of Largo di Torre Argentina, located in the southern part of the Campus Martius. It is a religious complex composed of four temples: Temple Juturna, Temple Fortuna Huiusce Diei, Temple Feronia, and Temple Lares Permarini. Those temples demonstrate that religious activity is being spread out across Rome and is not focused on the former religious places of the Capitoline Hill or the Forum Romanum. Art historian Stamper argues that the Largo Argentina has marked the beginning of multiple triumphal processions of successful generals. During the 1st century BC, there was a change from the Ionic style to the Corinthian Order. Acanthus leaves were sculpted on the top of these columns.

Two other important temples are the Temple of Apollo Sosianus and the temple of Bellona. One is associated with the cult of Apollo, and the other one is dedicated to the goddess of war, respectively. Both temples are located in the Circus Flaminius and were built during the 2nd century BC. Bellona's Temple was rebuilt in marble and travertine with six Corinthian columns along the front and nine along the sides

== Religious events ==
The Campus Martius was an area of religious practice. During the Ides of October fall, more specifically the 15th, it was seat of a festival dedicated to Mars takes, the October Horse. This tradition is said to have started during the 6th century B.C. The festival's rituals were supposed to protect the coming year's crop and the soldiers that had returned to Rome after a campaign. This festival was composed of many stages, including horse chariot races and the sacrifice of a horse followed by the decoration of the severed head with leaves.

Another important religious event was the Secular Games (Latin: ludi saeculares). Established during the Roman Republic, the games were resurrected by emperor Claudius when a man named Valesius prayed for a cure for his children's illness and was instructed to sacrifice to the underworld deities. Claudius did this as a way to not only appease the gods after several lightning bolts struck the city of Rome, but to emphasize the birth of a Golden Age. These games were a sort of a rite of passage that were held over several days and nights to mark the end of a new saeculum and the beginning of the next one. A saeculum was supposedly the longest possible length of a human life, either to 100 or 110 years old. The procession started at the Temple of Apollo, near the Circus Flaminius, proceeded into the Forum, passed along to the Vicus Tuscus, Velabrum, through the Forum Boarium, and finally ended at the Temple of Juno Regina. Augustus, when he revived the games, changed the destination of the procession from the Temple of Juno Regina to the Temple of Ceres, which is on the Aventine. The Temple of Apollo that was most likely used was that of Apollo Sosianus, establishing a religious connection between the Aventine and the southwestern Campus.

One of the last events was the Anna Perenna, also celebrated in the Campus Martius during the Ides of March. The people would go out to the Field of Mars for a day of feasting and drinking. According to historian Johannes Lylud, during the festival they also make public and private sacrifice for securing a healthy year.

== The Middle Ages ==
After the barbarian invasions cut the aqueducts, the rapidly dwindling population abandoned the surrounding hills and concentrated in the Campus Martius, depending on the Tiber for water, but subject to its flooding. Since it was next to the river and next to the Vatican, the area became the most populous part of Rome in the Middle Ages. The river supported a thriving economy and a supply of water, and the continuous stream of pilgrims to the city brought wealth to the area.

The Tiber flooded in December 791, and the Campus Martius was entirely submerged.

The main road connecting Rome to the rest of Europe was the Via Cassia, entering Rome through the Porta del Popolo in the northern part of the Campus Martius. Via Cassia became the most important road in medieval times, because it connected Rome with Viterbo, Siena, and Florence.

The other main road to Rome, the Via Aurelia, became unsafe in medieval times with the spread of malaria, because it passed through the unhealthy marshes near several coastal lakes in the Maremma lowlands (as Orbetello lagoon, Capalbio lake, and other Tombolos), and because its route by the sea made it more susceptible to attack from raiders. The coastal towns around Via Aurelia were areas subjected to kidnapping of women and plunder by Muslim Saracen pirates.

Because of the increasing importance of the area, several popes decided to improve its conditions. In the period 1513–1521, Pope Leo X built a route connecting Porta del Popolo to the Vatican. This road was first called the Via Leonina after the pope, later the more famous Via di Ripetta after the name of the river port. To improve the hygiene of the area, several ancient Roman aqueducts were restored to operating condition.

As the population of Rome greatly increased in the Middle Ages, the Campus Martius became a crowded multi-cultural place where many foreigners settled. In 1555, Pope Paul IV designated part of the southern part of the Campus Martius as the ghetto to contain the city's Jewish population.

== Modern Rome ==
After the Renaissance, as was the case for the rest of Rome, the Campus Martius did not change much; there were no other great building projects and the population decreased. This was reversed after Rome became capital of the newly established Kingdom of Italy in 1870.

Later, the area became even more crowded, and protecting embankments were built to stop the flooding of the Tiber. This made the area much safer from threat of water, but the tall embankments effectively destroyed the traditional embarkation point called the Ripetta ("little bank"), the narrow streets leading down to the river, and the vernacular buildings along the river edge.

== See also ==
- Champ de Mars (disambiguation)
- Field of Mars (disambiguation)
- Campus Esquilinus

== Works cited ==
- Osborne, John (2025). Rome in the Tenth Century: A History in Art. Cambridge University Press. ISBN 9781009639705.
