= Circus Flaminius =

Ancient Roman circus in Rome

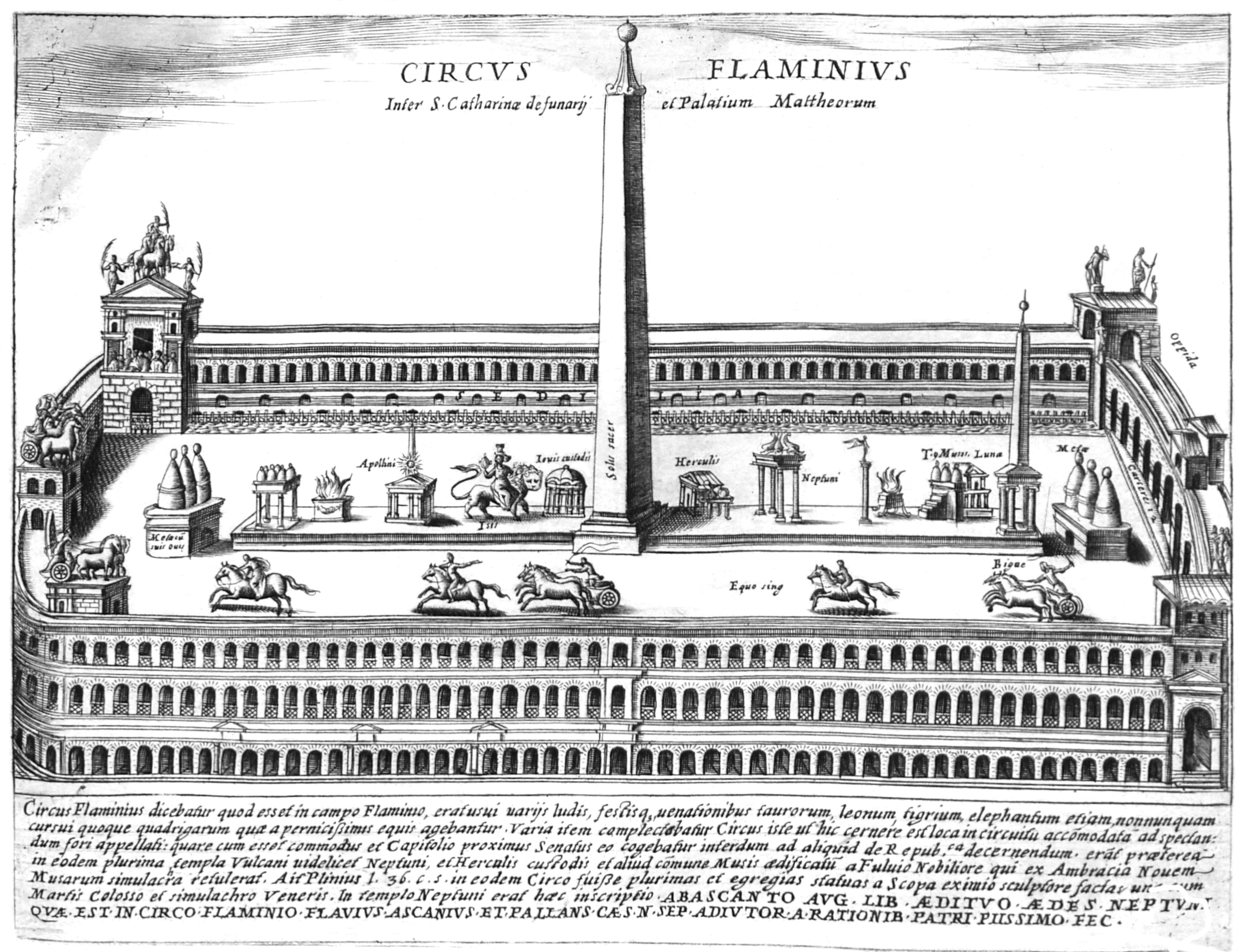
Fanciful engraving of the Circus Flaminius by Giacomo Lauro in 1641

The Circus Flaminius was a large, circular area in ancient Rome, located in the southern end of the Campus Martius near the Tiber River. It contained a small race-track used for obscure games, and various other buildings and monuments. It was "built", or sectioned off, by Gaius Flaminius in 221 BC. After Augustus divided the city into 14 administrative regions, the Circus Flaminius gave its name to Regio IX, which encompassed the Circus and all of the Campus Martius west of the Via Lata.

== Topography and structures ==
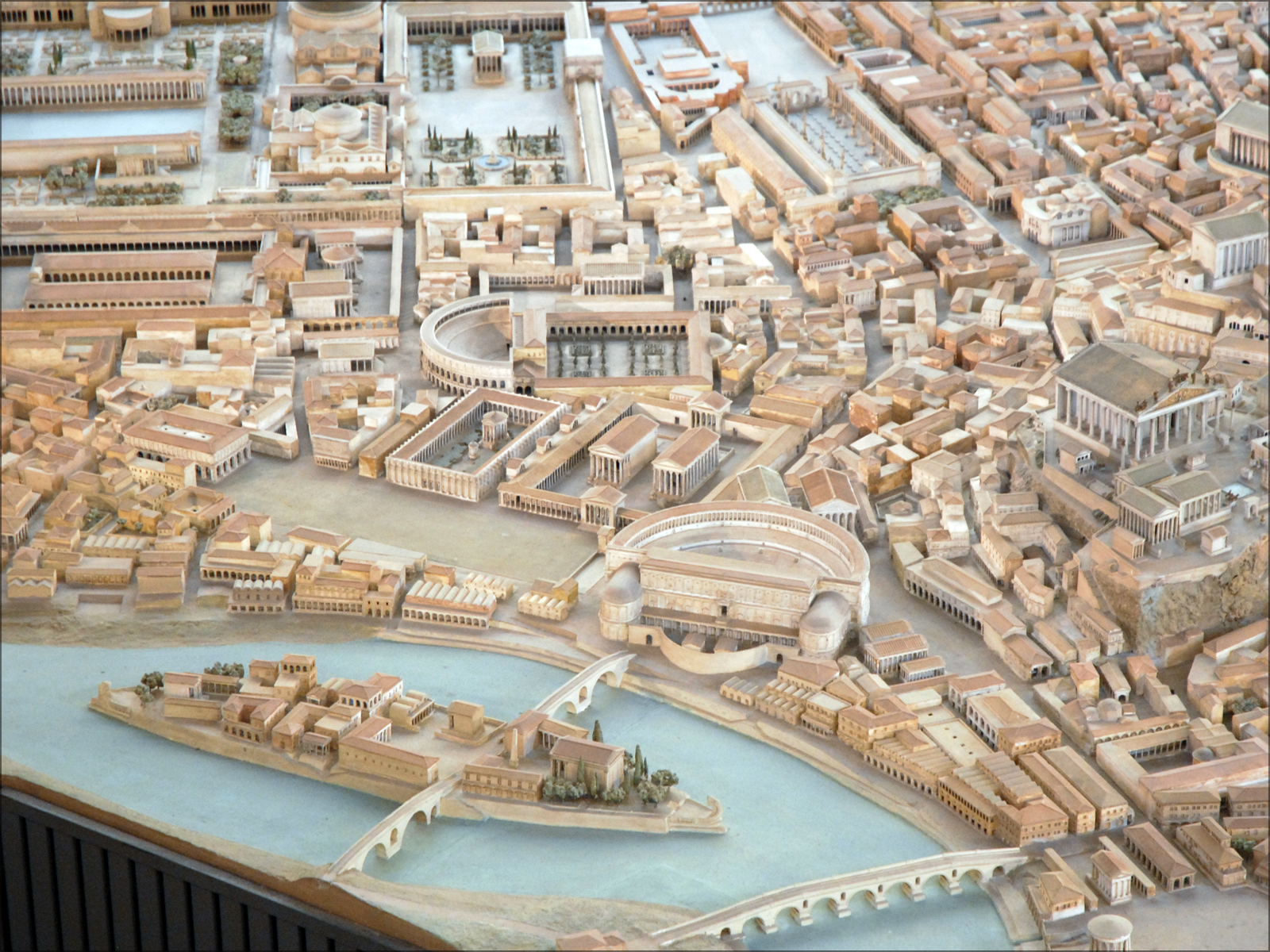
The plaza of the Circus Flaminius (left of the Theatre of Marcellus in the center), according to Italo Gismondi's model

In its early existence, the Circus was a loop, approximately 500 meters in length stretching across the Flaminian Fields (Prata Flaminia). Varro states that the actual Circus was built around the Fields, which were already a hallowed site for games by the time the Circus was laid in 220 BC. The ludi Taurei were hosted in the Fields since they were inaugurated by Rome's last king Lucius Tarquinius Superbus (d. 495 BC).

During the 2nd century BC, this broad space was encroached upon by buildings and monuments. The circus had no permanent seating, nor were there any permanent structures to mark the perimeter of the race track. By the early 3rd century AD, the only open space that remained was a small piazza in the center, no more than 300 meters long, where the ludi (public games) had always been held.

There were many structures in the vicinity of the circus (“in circo Flaminio”). The Temple of Pietas lay on the edge of the Forum Holitorium to the southeast. The Temple of Mars was situated in the northwest. It is estimated that by 220 BC there were six temples, including one to Apollo, in the Flaminian Fields. A theatre dedicated to Apollo was also set up in 179 BC, close to the temple of Apollo, and later rebuilt under the dictatorship of Caesar. The rebuilding of the theatre necessitated shortening the Circus itself, and required that several temples be destroyed.

The temple of Apollo "in circo" acquired special significance under Augustus, as a popular legend developed that he had been sired by the god while his mother Atia was visiting the temple. Augustus undertook myriad new constructions around the Circus, and probably had it paved for the first time. Most notably Augustus demolished the small theater dedicated to Apollo, as well as the temples of Diana and Pietas, to build the Theatre of Marcellus on the eastern side of the Circus. Augustus also built the Porticus Octaviae, which hemmed in the Circus on its northeastern side. Augustus' relation Lucius Marcius Phillipus restored the Temple of Hercules Musarum with a surrounding portico that could be accessed from the Circus.

In AD 15, statues to the deified Augustus were erected, dedicated by C. Norbanus Flaccus. In the early Principate two monumental arches were added at the north and south ends of the Circus, the northern one dedicated to Germanicus in the year of his death (19 CE), and the southern one to the stepson of Augustus, Drusus.

=== Location ===
Beginning in the Renaissance, the Circus Flaminius was identified with the ancient arcades facing onto the Via delle Botteghe Oscure ("Street of Dark Shops"), so-called because in the Middle Ages the arcades had sheltered the workshops of artisans. This placed the Circus north of the porticus Phillipi between the Piazza Paganica and Piazza Margana. In the 1960s, this long-held identification was challenged by the joining of new fragments to the Forma Urbis, which identified the arcades as in fact belonging to the Theatre of Balbus and its connecting portico (the "Crypta Balbi" as the archaeological site is known). New excavations combined with the new configuration of the Marble Plan altered the understanding of where the Circus Flaminius was located, moving it southwest closer to the Tiber and placing it on a southeast–northwest axis.

A previously disregarded reference in the Mirabilia Urbis Romae ("Circus Flammineus Ad Pontem Ludeorum"), which placed it near the Pons Fabricius, and a fragment of the Marble Plan labelled "CIR FLAM" which fitted south of the Portico of Octavia, confirmed the Circus to be roughly located between the Tiber to the south and the Porticos of Octavia and Phillipus to the north, and hemmed in by the Theatre of Marcellus to the east.

== Use ==
The Circus Flaminius was never meant to rival the much larger Circus Maximus, and, unlike the Circus Maximus, it was not just an entertainment venue. It almost certainly lacked a track designed for chariot racing. The only ludi held there were the Taurian Games, which featured horseback racing around turning posts (metae). The obscure Taurian Games were held to propitiate the gods of the underworld (di inferi), and seem to have been symbolically grounded in the site itself, as they were never moved to a different circus. Equestrian events were also associated with underworld deities in other rituals and festivals in the Campus Martius. Strabo makes no mention of equestrian activities taking place in the Circus Flaminius. Valerius Maximus, who is likely to be in error, is the only ancient source that claims the Ludi Plebeii ("Plebeian Games") were held there. In 2 BC, the circus was flooded for the slaughter of 36 crocodiles to commemorate the building of the Forum of Augustus.

The Circus also hosted ceremonies related to the Roman triumph, as the Flaminian Fields traditionally figured along the triumphal route towards Capitoline Hill. In 63 BC Lucius Licinius Lucullus celebrated his triumph in the Third Mithridatic War and exhibited his spoils in the Circus, including a solid gold statue of Mithridates. Augustus did the same when he exhibited the captured insignia of the enemy armies from his campaigns in Dalmatia in the northern part of the Circus.

According to Plutarch, the Dictator Sulla massacred 6,000 prisoners in the Circus Flaminius after the Battle of the Colline Gate in 82 BC. Prisoners of war from the nearby town of Antemnae were rounded up in the Circus and slaughtered while the Senate met in the adjacent Temple of Bellona; the screams which could be heard from the Temple were a way of intimidating the senators.

The Circus Flaminius was also used as a market. Assemblies were often held within it. In 9 BC, it was the venue where Augustus delivered the Laudatio of Drusus.

== Later history ==
The buildings remained in use until the end of the fourth century, when the area was finally abandoned. In the Middle Ages the ruins of the Stadium of Domitian (the Piazza Navona) were often incorrectly identified as the Circus Flaminius. In the 16th century the "Castrum Aureum" ("golden camp") mentioned in a papal bull of Pope Celestin III in 1192, was also identified as the Circus.

In 1555, Pope Paul IV formed the Jewish Ghetto in the area encompassing much of the former Circus Flaminius. The Great Synagogue of Rome stands roughly where the southern end of the arena was located.

== See also ==
- List of ancient monuments in Rome

== Sources ==
- Platner, Samuel (1929). A Topographical Dictionary of Ancient Rome. Oxford University Press.
- Civilization of the ancient Mediterranean: Greece and Rome. Vol. II. Scribner's. 1998.
- Humphrey, John (1986). Roman Circuses: Arenas for Chariot Racing. Butler & Tanner Ltd. pp. 540–545. ISBN 0-520-04921-7.
