= Theatre of Marcellus =

Ancient Roman theater in Rome

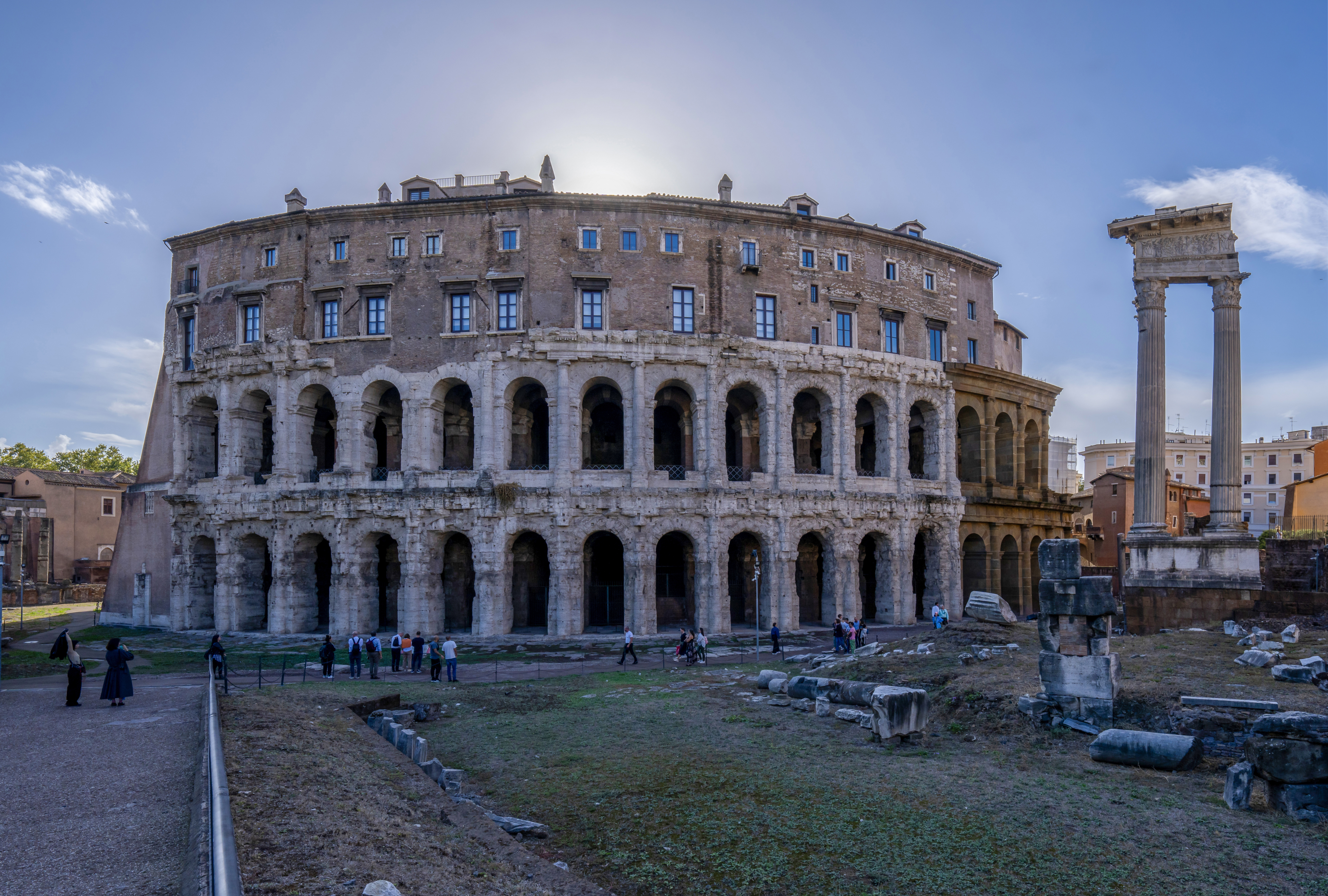
- View from Via Montanara

- Shown within Augustan Rome
- Interactive map of Theatre of Marcellus
- 41°53′31″N 12°28′46″E
- Type: Roman theatre (structure)
- Location: Regio IX Circus Flaminius

History
- Built: 13 BC
- Built by: Julius Caesar Augustus Caesar / Marcus Marcellus

The Theatre of Marcellus (Latin: Theatrum Marcelli, Italian: Teatro di Marcello) was an ancient open-air theatre in Rome, Italy, built in the closing years of the Roman Republic. It is located in the modern rione of Sant'Angelo. In the sixteenth century, it was converted into a palazzo.

== Construction and Roman period use ==
Space for the theatre was cleared by Julius Caesar, who was murdered before its construction could begin; the theatre was advanced enough by 17 BC that part of the celebration of the ludi saeculares took place within the theatre; it was completed in 13 BC and formally inaugurated in 12 BC by Augustus, named after his nephew Marcus Claudius Marcellus who had died in 23 BC.

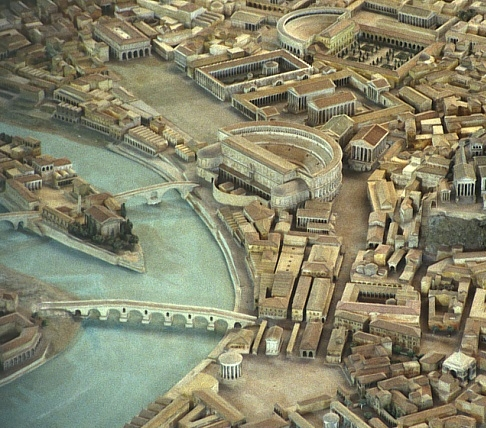
A detail of Gismondi's scale model of ancient Rome at the Museum of Roman Civilization, showing the Theatre of Marcellus between the Circus Flaminius and the Forum Olitorium, the Roman vegetable market. The bridge connecting it to Tiber Island is the Pons Fabricius.

The theatre was 111 m in diameter and was the largest and most important theatre in Ancient Rome; it could originally hold between 11,000 and 20,000 spectators. A catalogue compiled at the end of the 4th century recorded that the theatre's seating capacity was 17,580 persons. It was an impressive example of what was to become one of the most pervasive urban architectural forms of the Roman world. The theatre was built mainly of tuff, and concrete faced with stones in the pattern known as opus reticulatum, completely sheathed in white travertine. However, it is also the earliest dateable building in Rome to make use of fired Roman brick, then a new introduction from the Greek world.

The network of arches, corridors, tunnels and ramps that gave access to the interiors of such Roman theatres were normally ornamented with a screen of engaged columns in Greek orders: Doric at the base, Ionic in the middle. It is believed that Corinthian columns were used for the upper level but this is uncertain as the theatre was reconstructed in the Middle Ages, removing the top tier of seating and the columns.

Like other Roman theatres in suitable locations, it had openings through which the natural setting could be seen, in this case the Tiber Island to the southwest. The permanent setting, the scaena, also rose to the top of the cavea as in other Roman theatres.

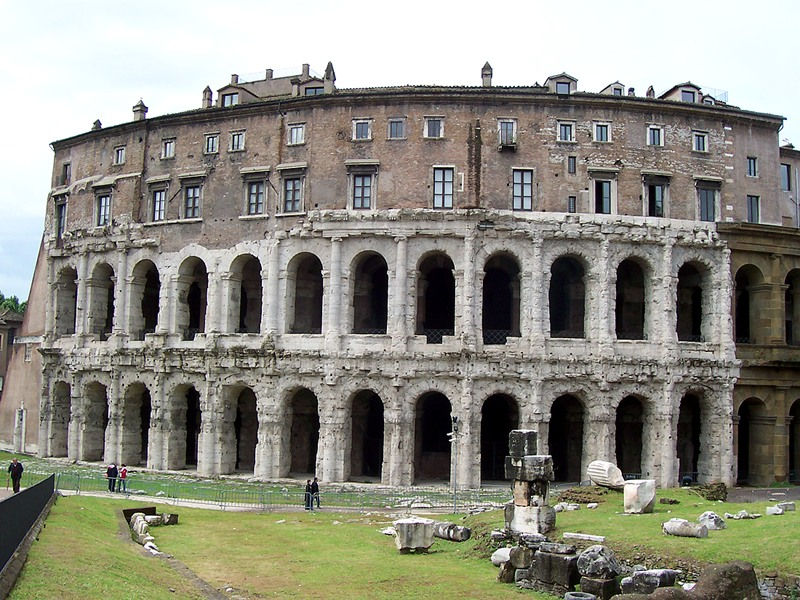
End section, showing later redevelopment

== Later use ==
The theatre fell out of use in the early 4th century and the structure served as a quarry, e.g., for the Pons Cestius in 370 AD. However, the statues located inside the building were restored by Petronius Maximus in 421 and the remaining structure still housed small residential buildings. In the Early Middle Ages the theatre was used as a fortress of the Roman family of Faffo or Fabi (called "from Pescheria") and then at the end of the 11th century (when it was known as templum Marcelli), by Pier Leoni and later his heirs (the Pierleoni). This saved the complex from further destruction. The Savelli held it in the 13th century. Later, in the 16th century, the residence of the Orsini, designed by Baldassare Peruzzi, was built atop the ruins of the ancient theatre. By the 19th century, rises in the street level meant that almost half the ground floor was below it.

Now the upper floors are divided into multiple clubs, and its surroundings are used as a venue for small summer concerts; the Portico d'Ottavia lies to the north west leading to the Roman Ghetto and the Tiber to the south west. The Embassy of the Sovereign Military Order of Malta to the Holy See is located in the premises of Casa Litta – Palazzo Orsini, in Teatro Marcello.

== Influence ==
According to his son, Christopher Wren aspired to the "ancient Roman Grandeur discernible in the Theatre of Marcellus" in his design for the Sheldonian Theatre, although its design is "not... an obvious derivative of the semicircular Theatre of Marcellus" and there is no evidence that it was modelled on it.

== Copies ==
A 1:100 scale model of the theatre is found in Room IX of the Museum of Roman Civilization in Rome.

== Gallery ==
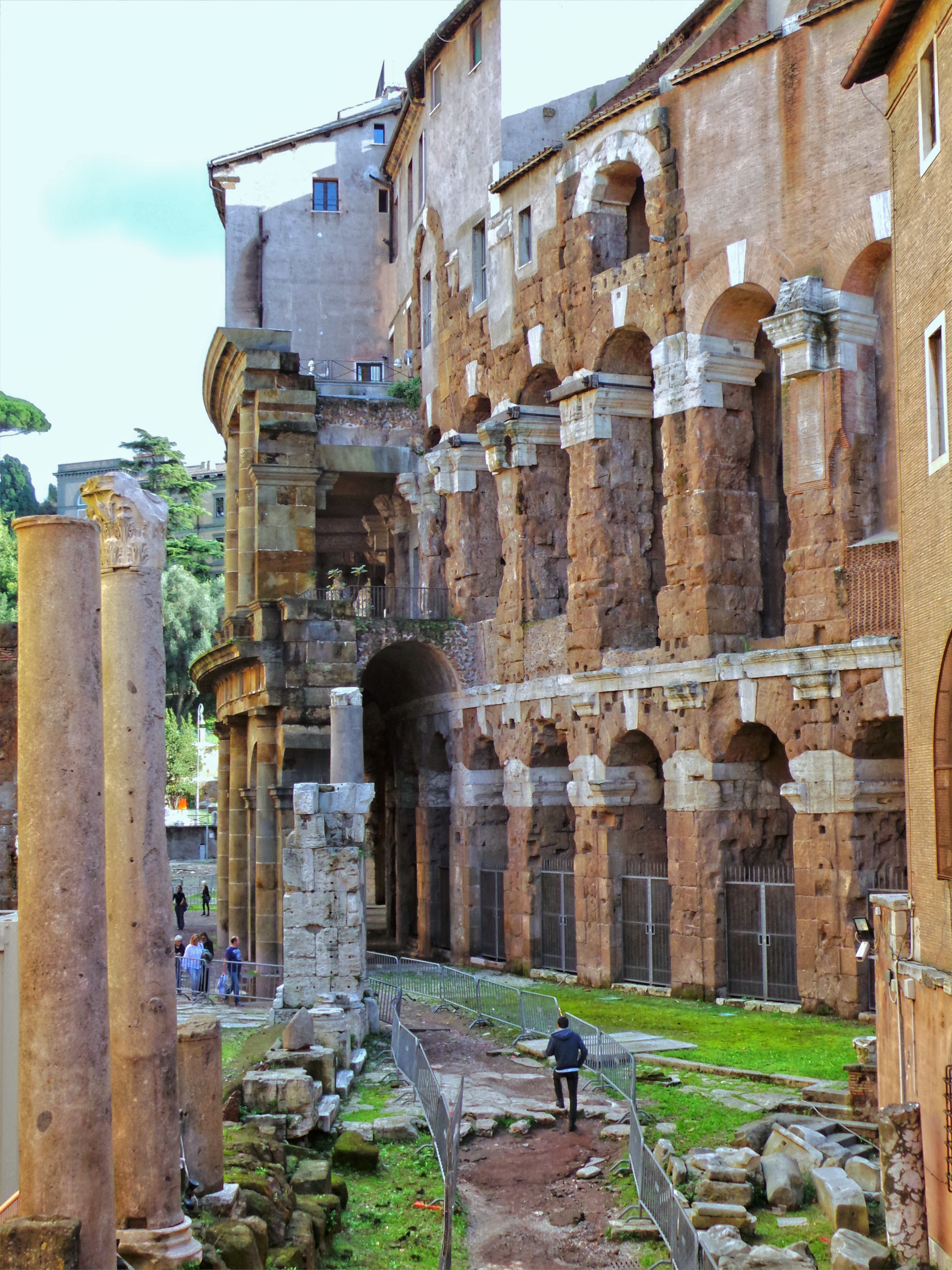
The arcade wall exposed

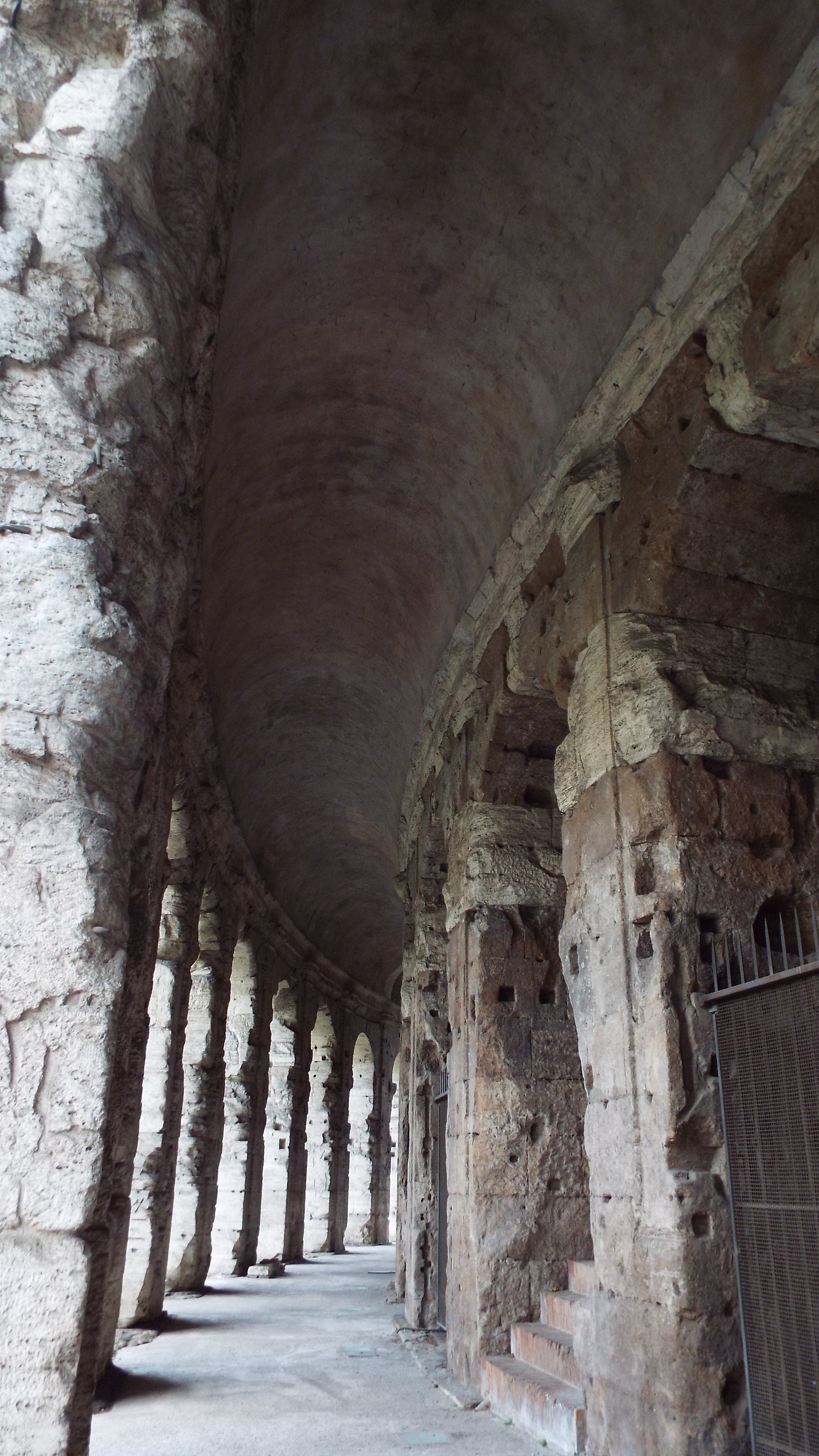
Along the arcades

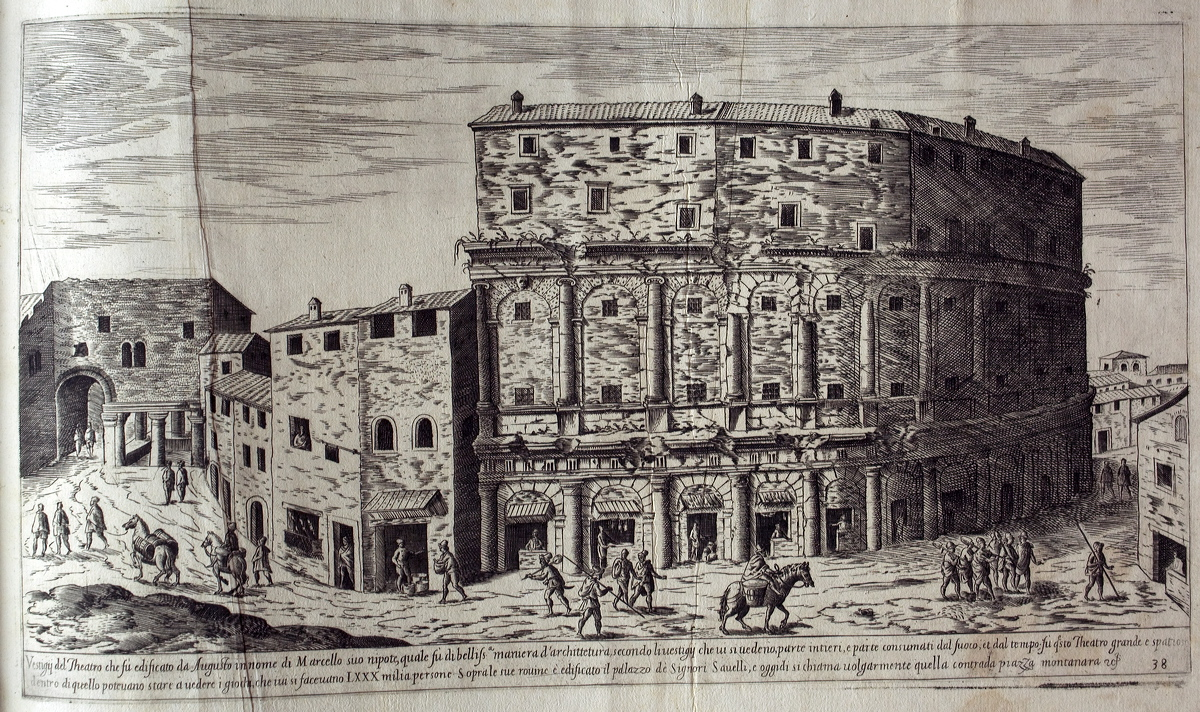
Appearance in 1575

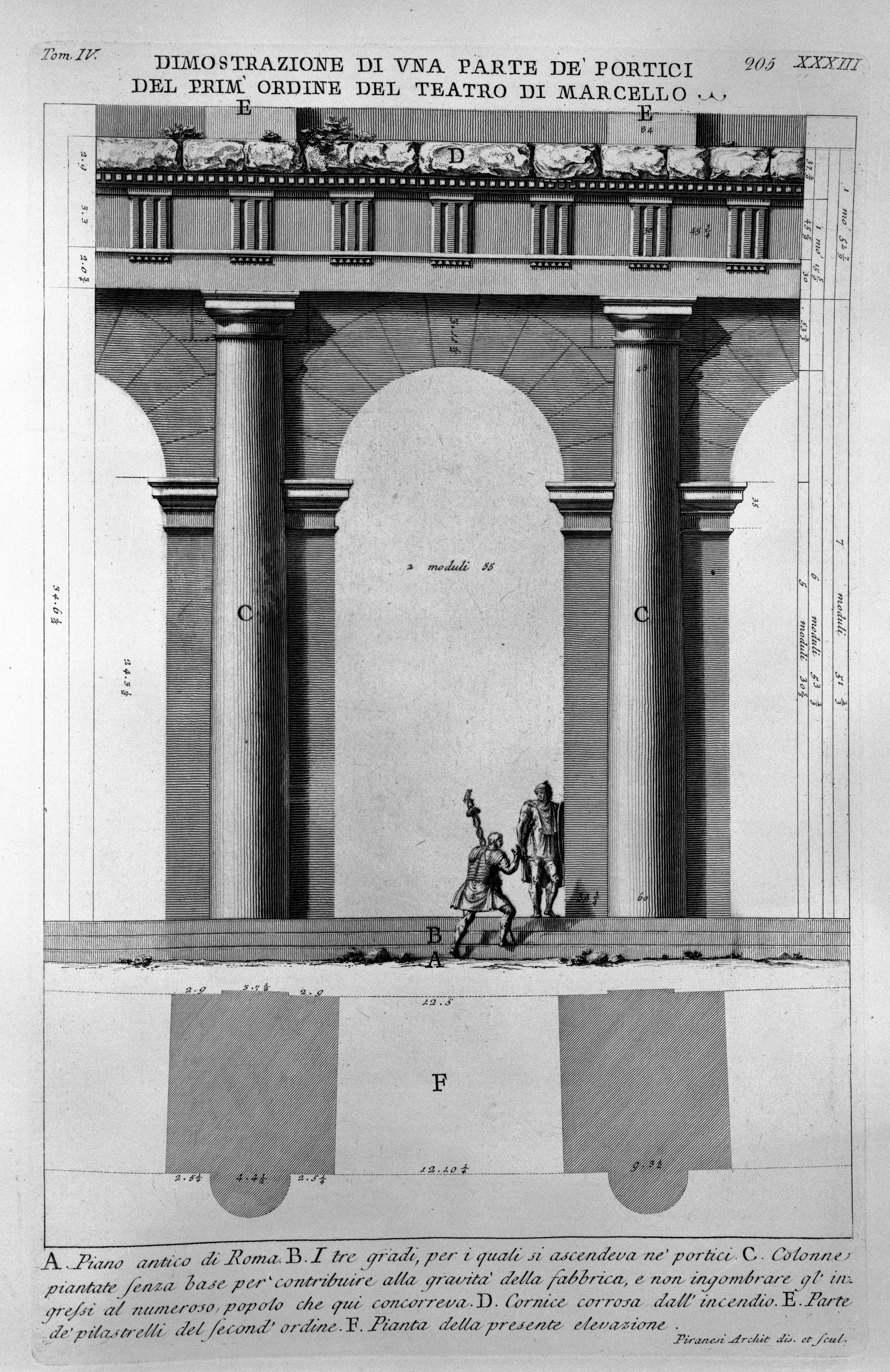
G.B. Piranesi's etching of a Doric bay

== See also ==
- Circus Maximus – Ancient Roman circus in Rome
- List of ancient monuments in Rome
- List of Roman theatres
- Roman theatre of Lillebonne

Preceded by Stadium of Domitian	Landmarks of Rome; Theatre of Marcellus	Succeeded by Theatre of Pompey
