= Museum of Roman Civilization =

Archeological museum in Rome, Italy

- Museo della Civiltà Romana
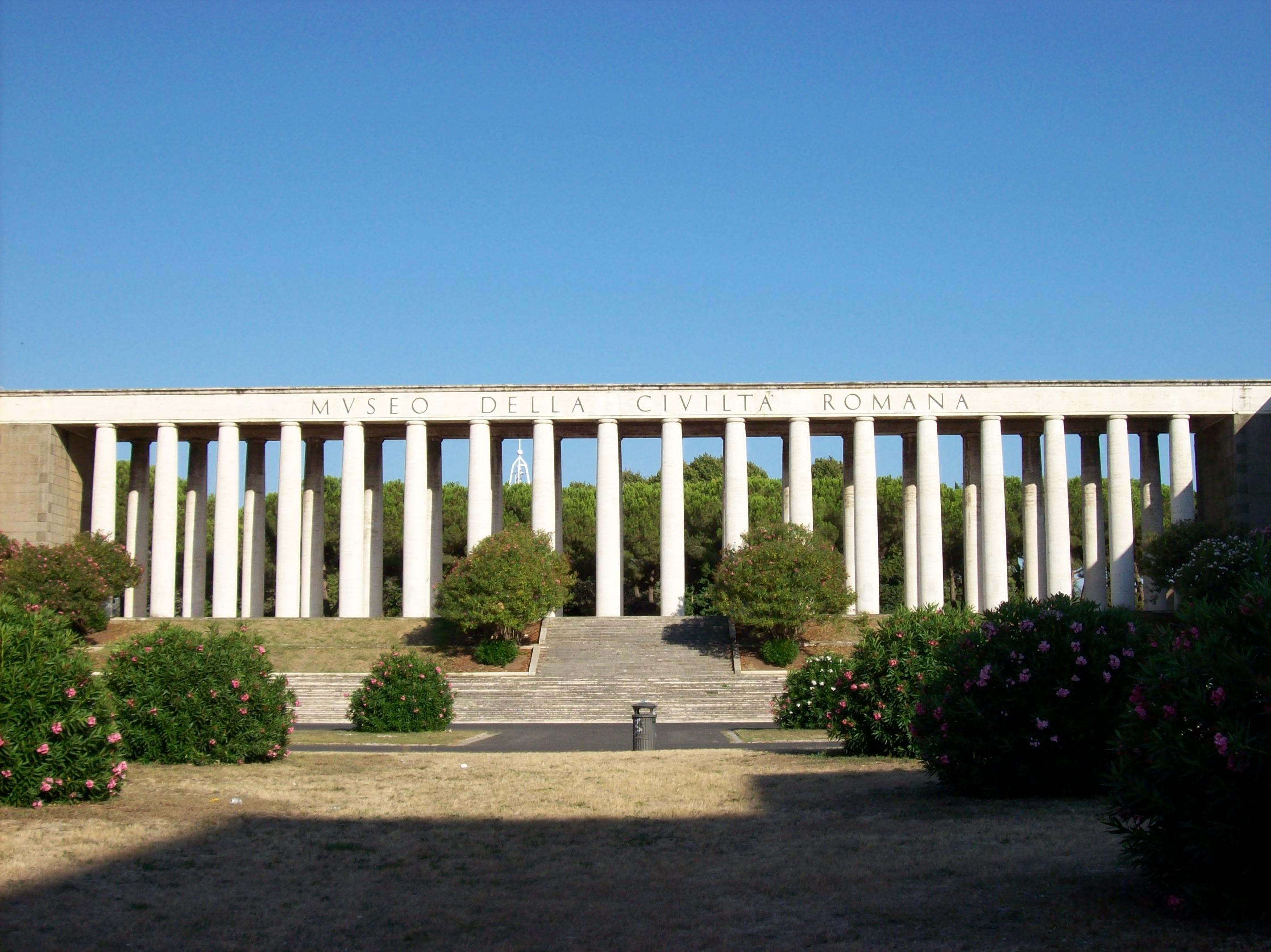
- Click on the map for a fullscreen view
- Established: 1952
- Location: Piazza Giovanni Agnelli 10, 00144 Rome, Italy
- Coordinates: 41°49′55″N 12°28′41″E
- Type: Archaeology, Art Museum
- Website: www.museociviltaromana.it

The Museum of Roman Civilization (Italian: Museo della Civiltà Romana) is a museum in the Esposizione Universale Roma district of Rome devoted to aspects of Ancient Roman Civilization.

The museum has been closed for renovation since 2014.

== History and general introduction ==
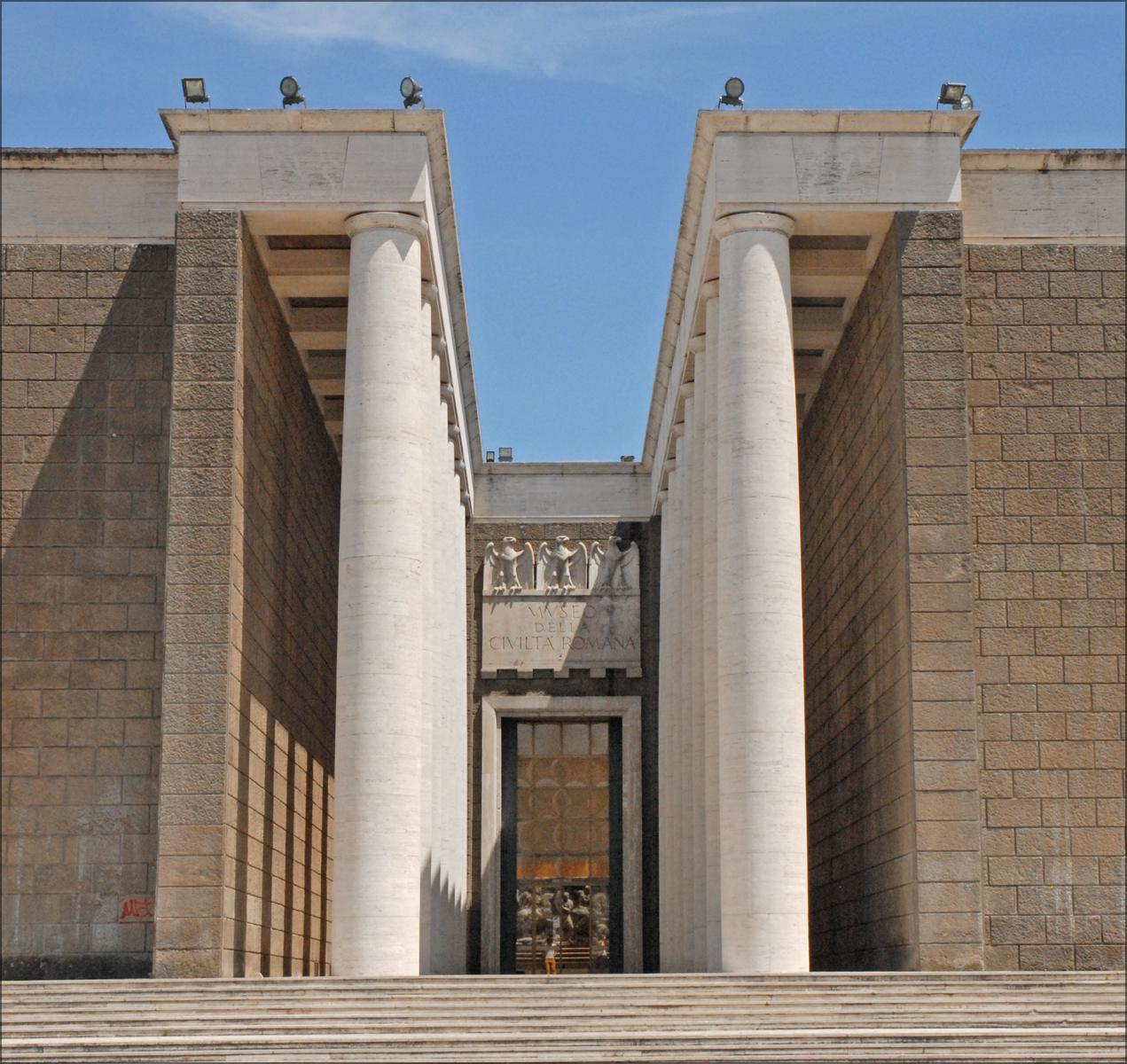
The museum from the outside

The museum was designed by the architects Pietro Ascheri, D. Bernardini and Cesare Pascoletti (1939–1941). Its 59 sections illustrate the history of Roman civilization from its origins to the 4th century, with models and reproductions, as well as original material. The premises are shared with a planetarium.

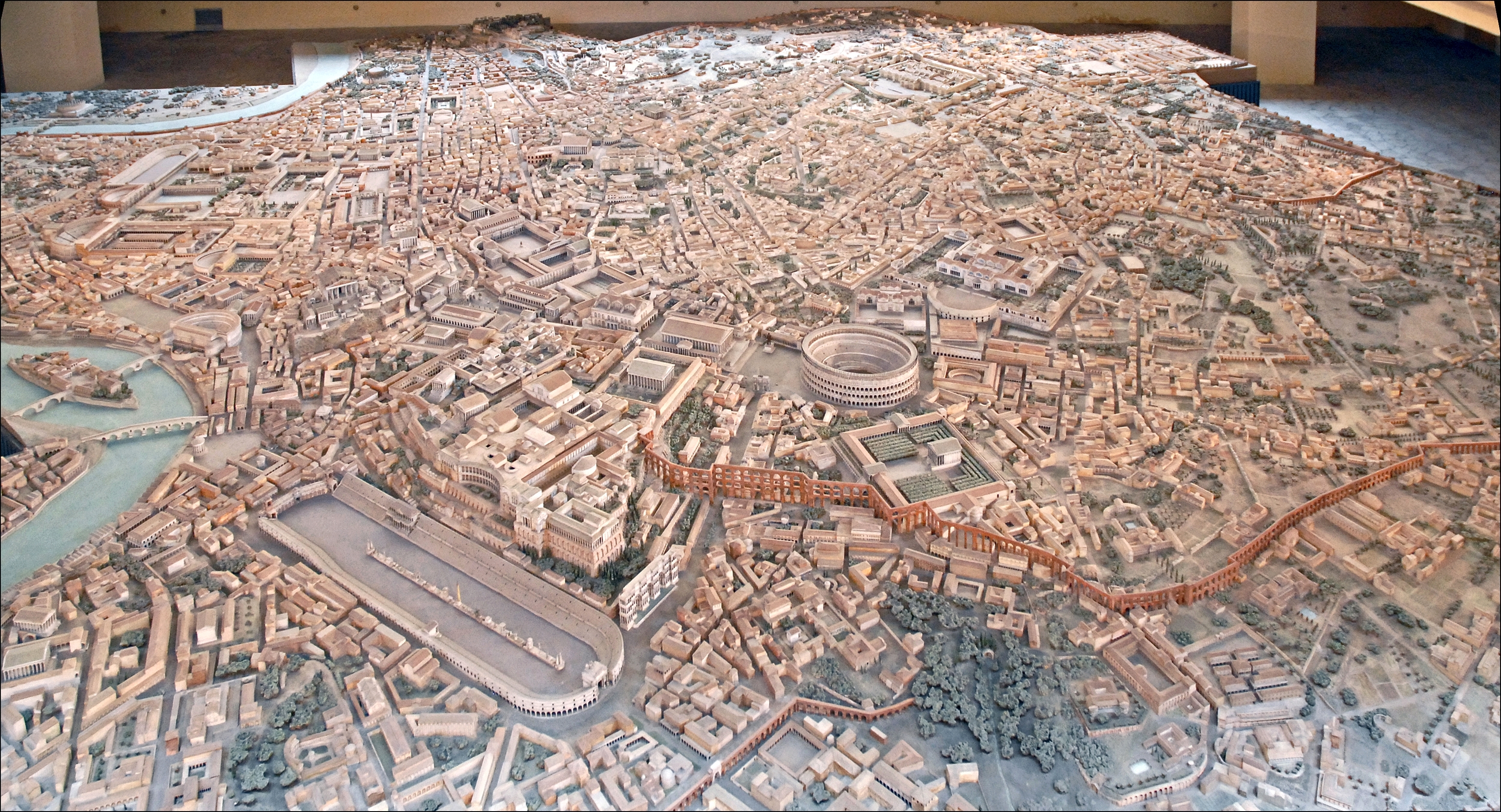
Model of ancient Rome by Italo Gismondi

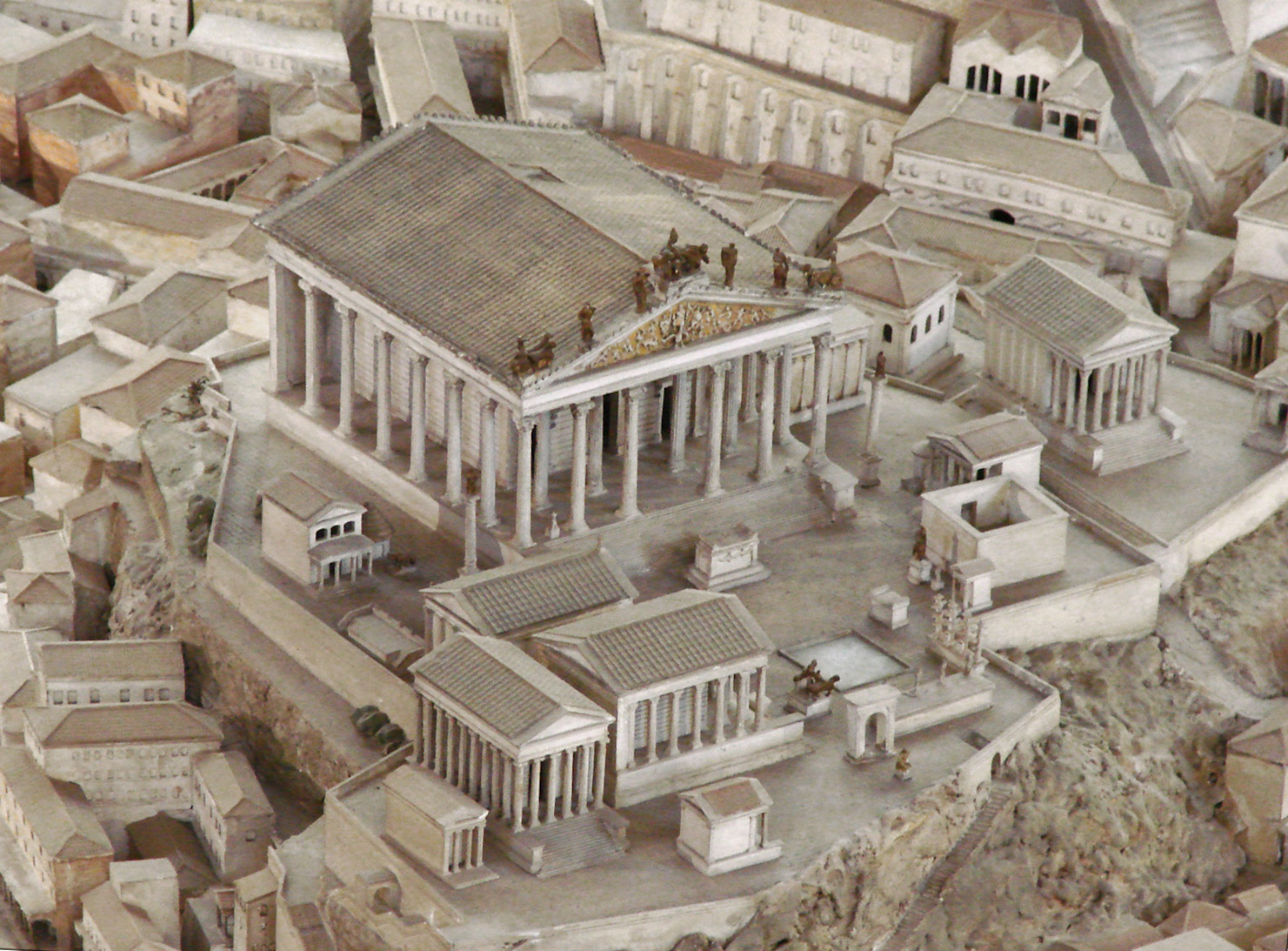
Detail of the model of the Capitoline Hill

It houses, among other things:

- a model of Archaic Rome (Room XVIII)
- Il Plastico di Roma Imperiale, a 1:250 scale model of ancient Rome in the age of Constantine I by Italo Gismondi (Room XXXVII-XXXVIII), derived from the early 3rd-century Severan Forma Urbis Romae as updated by Lanciani and integrated with archeological discoveries. This model is made of plaster. The model was ordered by Mussolini in 1933 in honor of Augustus's 2000th birthday, was begun in 1935, and adjusted throughout Gismondi's life until 1971.
- examples of late imperial and early Christian art
- a complete sequence of casts of the spiral reliefs round Trajan's Column, arranged in horizontal rows at ground level to facilitate reading.
- a reconstructed Roman library based on that in the Villa Adriana at Tivoli

The museum was closed for renovation in January 2014, and work on the renovation was started in June 2017. As of January 2025, the design has been finalized, and the estimated date of completion is the second quarter of 2026. The official date of reopening, however, has not yet been announced.

== Structure ==
There are three main itineraries through the museum:

- Historical sections
- Thematic sections
- Model of Imperial Rome

=== Historical sections ===
- Room V-VI: Roman Legends and Primitive Culture - the origins of Rome
- Room VII: The conquest of the Mediterranean
- Room VIII: Caesar
- Room IX: Augustus
  - Lifesize copy of the pronaos of the Monumentum Ancyranum, the Temple of Augustus and Rome, Ankara, Turkey, including the Res Gestae Divi Augusti inscription
  - Scale reconstruction model (1:100) of the Theatre of Marcellus, Rome
  - Scale reconstruction model (1:20) of the Tropaeum Alpium in La Turbie, France
  - Scale reconstruction model (1:200) of the Pont du Gard, Nîmes, France
- Room X: The family of Augustus and the Julio-Claudian emperors
- Room XI: The Flavian Dynasty
- Room XII: Trajan and Hadrian
- Room XIII: The emperors from Antoninus Pius to the Severans
- Room XIV: The emperors from Macrinus to Justinian
- Room XV: Christianity
- Room XVI: The army
- Room XVIII: Model of archaic Rome

=== Thematic sections ===
- Room XXXVI: School
- Room XXXIX: Living spaces
- Room XLVI: Rights
- Room XLVII: Libraries
- Room XLVIII: Music
- Room XLIX: Literature and science
- Room L: Medicine and drugs
- Room LI: Trajan's Column
- Room LII: Industry and craft
- Room LIII: Agriculture, herding and land management
- Room LIV: Hunting, fishing and food
- Room LV: Commerce and economic life
- Room LVI: Art of rome

=== Model of Imperial Rome ===
- Room XXXVII-XXXVIII: Model of Imperial Rome (in the age of Constantine I)

== Appearance in popular culture ==
Il Plastico is today the most important reference for any serious attempt of reconstruction of the Ancient Rome: it has been used for the "Rome Reborn 1.0" 3D Visualization Project (B. Frischer, Director, University of Virginia; D. Favro, Associate Director, UCLA; D. Abernathy, Director of 3D Modeling, University of Virginia; G. Guidi, Director of 3D Scanning, Politecnico di Milano). Gismondi's model can be seen also in a few shots of Ridley Scott's Gladiator.

In the 2015 James Bond film Spectre, the marble colonnade of the museum doubled as a cemetery after the Archconfraternity of the Departed confraternity barred the filming of a funeral scene at the Campo Verano cemetery. The colonnade was also featured in the 2024 film Conclave. The music video of the song "Cruel Summer" Ace of Base was also filmed at here in 1998.

Preceded by Museum of Contemporary Art of Rome	Landmarks of Rome; Museum of Roman Civilization	Succeeded by Museum of the Ara Pacis
