= Roman Republican art =

Art of the Republican period of Roman history

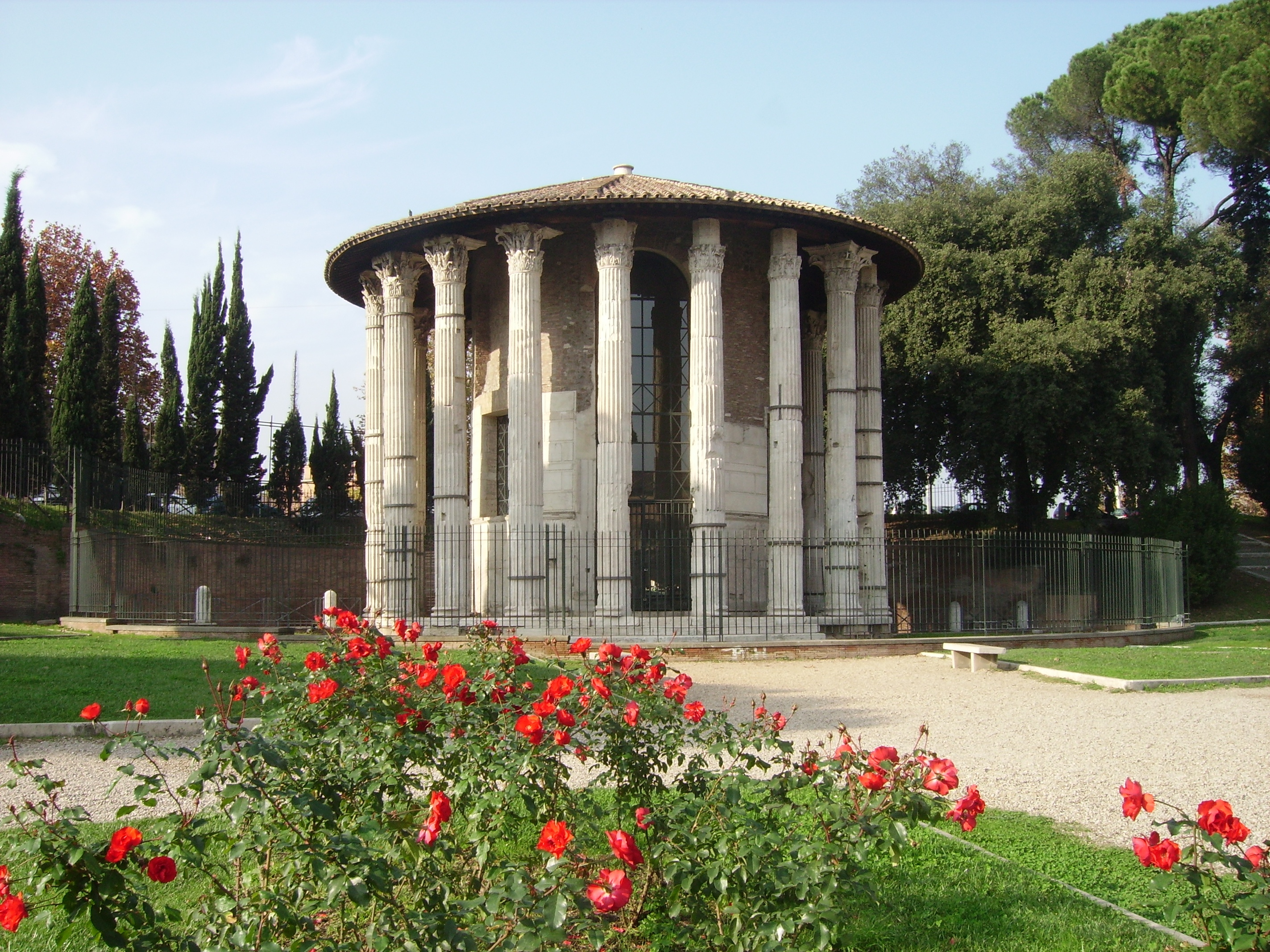
Temple of Hercules Victor in Rome

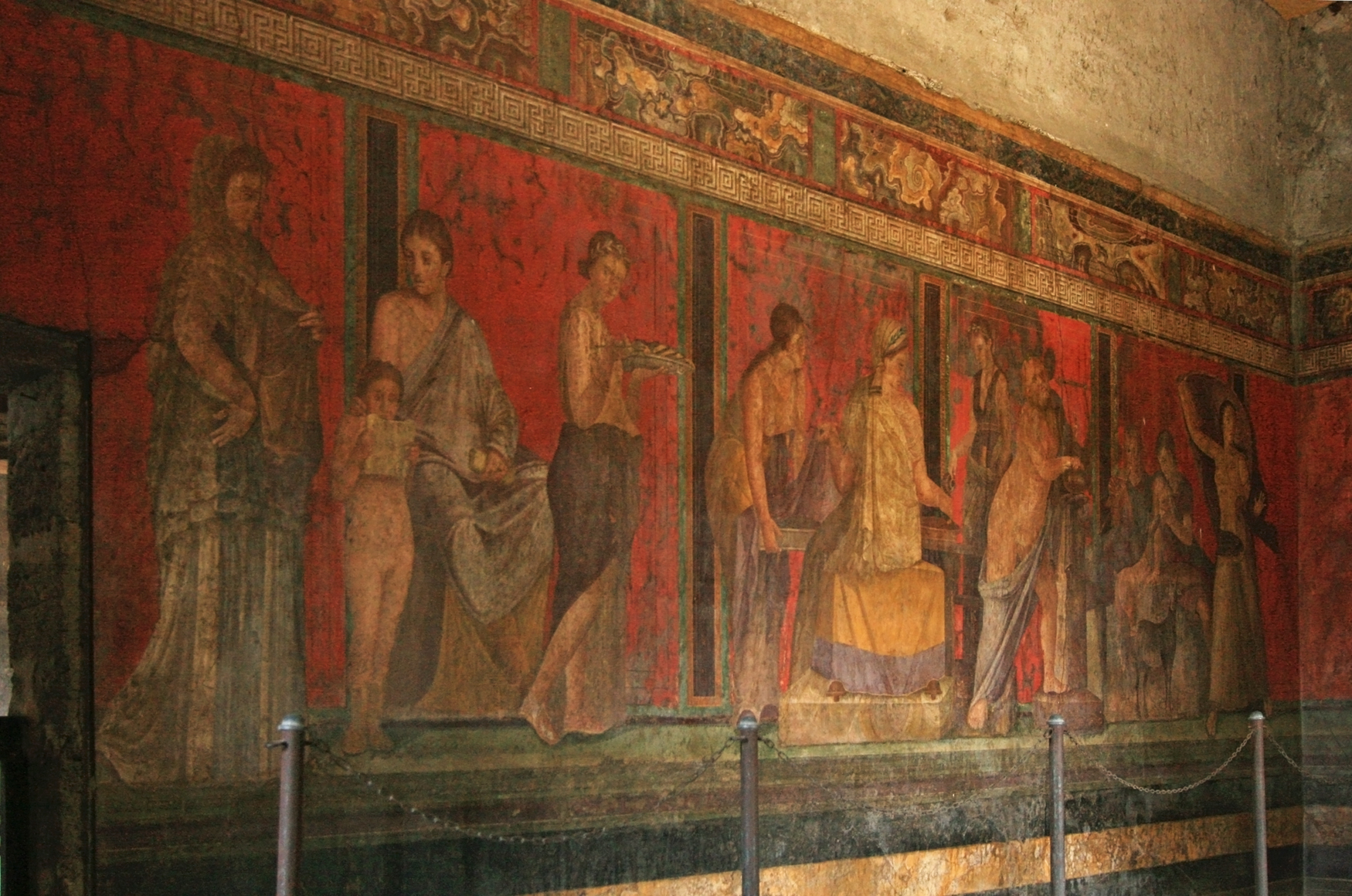
Villa of the Mysteries in Pompeii

Roman Republican art is the artistic production that took place in Roman territory during the period of the Republic, conventionally from 509 BC to 27 BC.

The military, political and economic development of the Roman Republic did not coincide with the development of an autonomous artistic civilization. In the Republican period at least three artistic moments can be distinguished: the first as a continuation of archaic culture, where production in the city did not manifest any stylistic characteristic of its own; a second linked to the conquest of Greece and the arrival of huge spoils of works of art; and a third phase starting during the reign of Sulla, when specifically Roman artworks began to appear.

== Beginnings of artistry ==
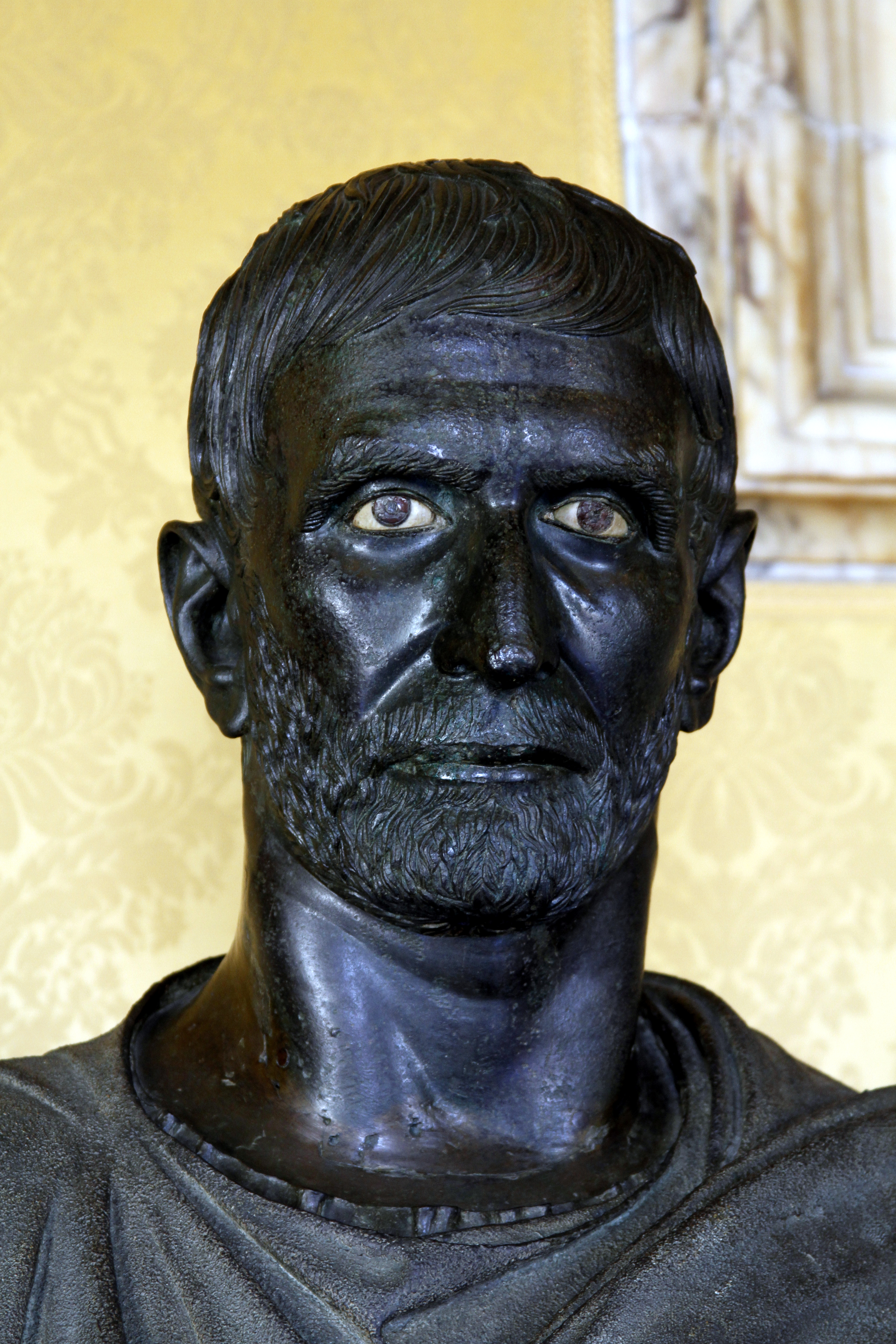
Capitoline Brutus at the Capitoline Museum

509 BC traditionally marks the expulsion of the Etruscan kings and the beginning of the Republic. Artistic production remained influenced by Etruscan culture, as well as from the Greek cities of Campania. Until 390 BC, Rome was a single city in central Italy benefited from a position that favored commercial transit. With the retreat of the Etruscans from Campania after the Battle of Cumae, the commercial traffic weakened and the city was forced to expand its territory. From 390 to 265 BC, the Romans managed to conquer sub-Apennine Italy.

Religious activity in Rome at that time was intense and many temples were constructed. Each had its own statues, mostly bronze, which decorated the city. Some references on the coins and on contemporary finds of Tarquinia, Chiusi, Perugia, and Volterra allow us to make hypotheses on the appearance of these statues. They represented practical art placed for the purposes of storytelling or modest decoration.

This scarcity of artistic interest is well justified by the framework of the Roman mentality, intended as an expression of a population used to fighting against nature, poverty and neighboring populations. The Roman patrician was typically a tough, violent and tenacious man, forged by fatigue, having practical and immediate interests. They generally disregarded anything that did not bring immediate utility. In the second century BC, for example, the Senate arranged for the demolition of a newly constructed stone theater "as a useless and harmful thing to our customs".

A unique example of sculpture of superior production and craftsmanship is the Capitoline Brutus, the object of numerous dating hypotheses ranging from the 4th to the 1st century BC. The strong, expressive composition distances it from Greek and Etruscan art, indicating an evolution of Italian style.

== Spoils of war ==
Haec ego, quo melior laetiorque in dies fortuna rei publicae est, [...] eo plus horreo, ne illae magis res nos ceperint quam nos illas. Infesta, mihi credite, signa ab Syracusis inlata sunt hunc urbi. Iam nimis multos audio Corinthi et Athenarum ornamenta laudantes mirantesque et antefixa fictilia deorum Romanorum ridentes. Ego hos malo propitios deos et ita spero futuros, si in suis manere sedibus patiemur.

—Livy: Ab Urbe Condita Libri
liber XXXIV
Translation:

This information, brighter and better the experience is [...] the more I fear that these things will capture us and we them. Danger, believe me, they are the signs of this were brought from Syracuse city. They are too many people praising and admiring those which adorn Athens and Corinth and of earth; I hear the gods, Roman gods. I prefer that these gods who are propitious, and I trust that they will be if we remain in their present abodes.

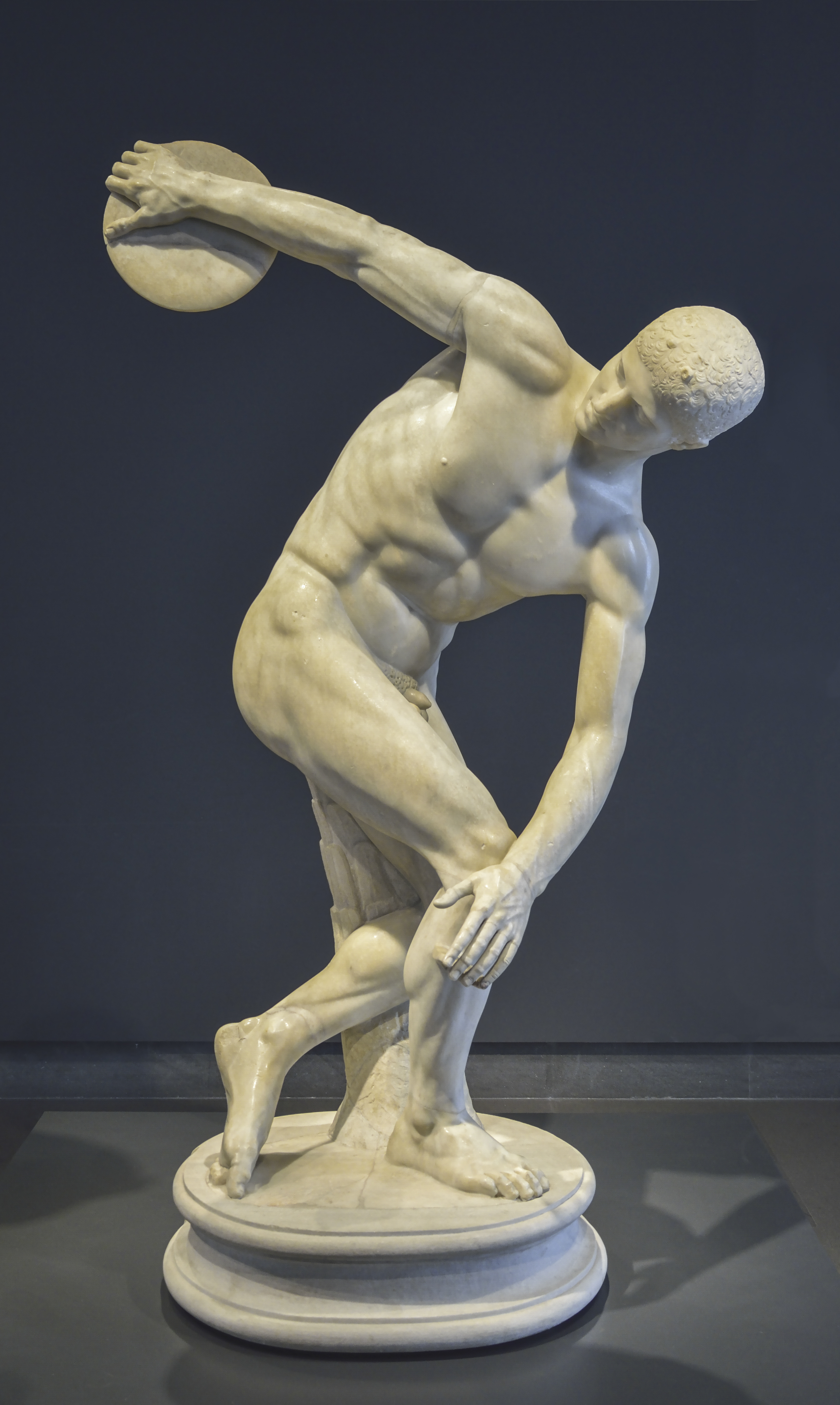
Roman copy of the Greek Discobolus of Myron

In 280 BC, the army of Pyrrhus of Epirus clashed with the Romans in Italy, the first large direct contact between Romans and Greek people. This was followed in 272 BC by the capture of Taranto, the capture of Reggio in 270 BC, and the league with Syracuse during the first Punic war (264 - 241 BC). The admission of the Romans to the Isthmian Games in 228 BC was equivalent to the entry of Rome into Greek civilization.

The capture of Syracuse in 212 BC was decisive, following which Marcus Claudius Marcellus brought back a huge number of Greek works of art to Rome. This marked a turning point in Roman culture and artistic practice. Even then there were those who reproached Marcellus "for having filled with idleness and chatter and for having led to urban discussion of art and artists [...] those people accustomed to fighting and cultivating the fields, avoiding any softness and frivolity.".

Subsequently, after the Battle of Zama in 202 BC, Rome would cement itself as a powerful force in the Mediterranean leading to opportunities to import Greek art that were continuous and frequent. This includes the victory against Philip V of Macedonia (194 BC), the war against Antiochus III, the capture of Magnesia ad Sipylum in Asia Minor (198 BC), the victory over Perseus of Macedon, and the capture of Corinth (146 BC). This also marked the arrival of architects in Rome such as Hermodorus of Salamis and sculptors such as Polycles. While the admiration for Greek works was vast, the understanding of the artistic and historical value of these works remained a rare prerogative of the city's elite.

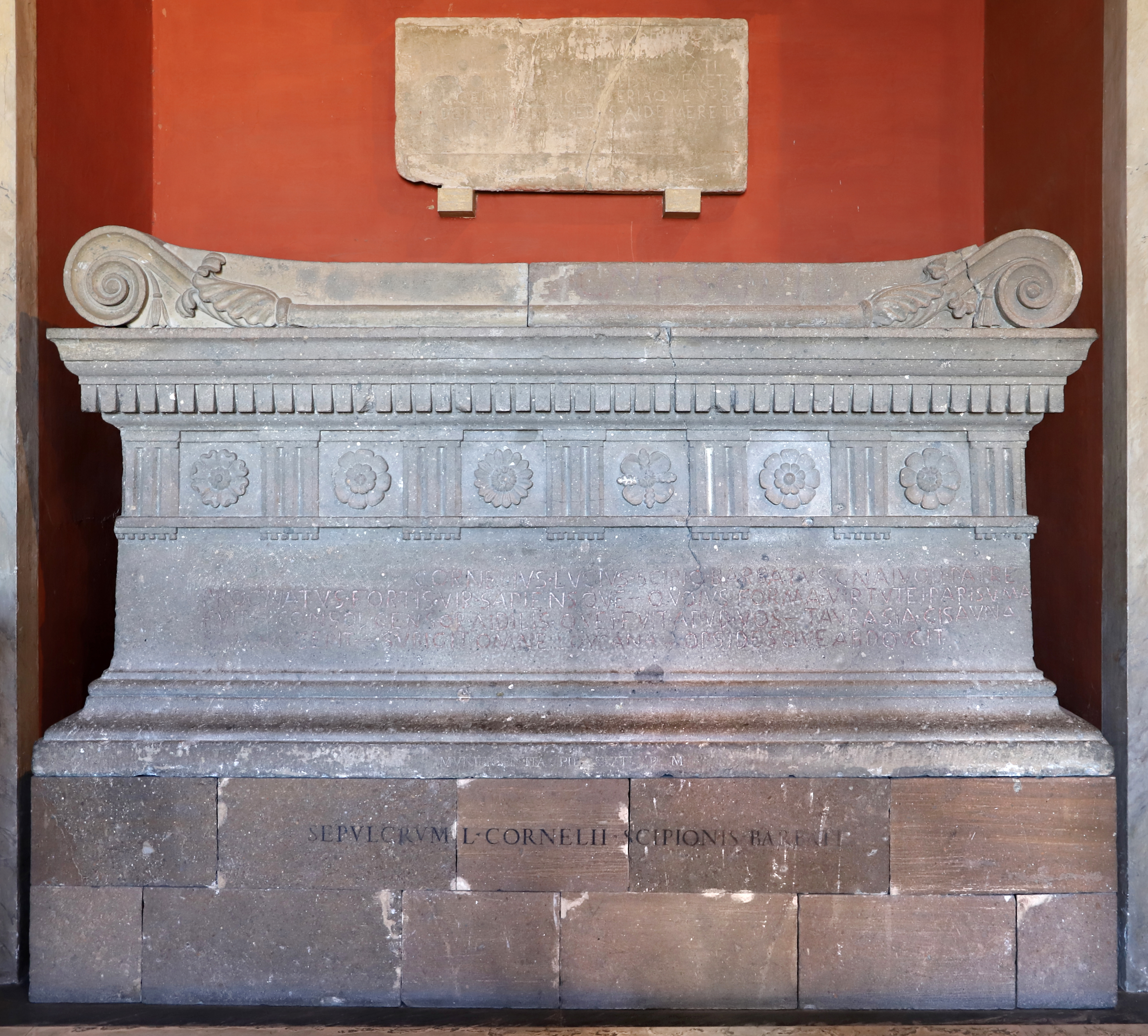
The Sarcophagus of Lucius Cornelius Scipio Barbatus

In less than a century, Rome was home to a large group of wealthy art collectors. They themselves, as Cicero testifies in the Verrine, had a certain modesty in publicly confessing their appreciation for art, knowing that society viewed it negatively. Many frowned upon the implied superiority of Greek culture. The controversy on the subject focused on contrasting positions of the Scipionic Circle, open to Hellenic cultural suggestions, and the conservatism of Cato and his followers.

After the victory against Antiochus III, the quantity of Greek works in Rome was so large that Livy wrote: "[was] the end of the wooden and terracotta simulacra in the temples of Rome, replaced by imported works of art."

The first white marble buildings in Rome were two small constructions, a somewhat "shy" debut: the temple of Jupiter Stator and the temple of Juno Regina, enclosed by an arcade, one of which was the work of Hermodorus of Salamis, whose statues of divinities were sculpted by artisans from Delos. In 136 BC, Hermodorus built a temple in Campo Marzio, which contained two colossal statues of Mars and Aphrodite. Among the best preserved remains of that era is the Temple of Hercules Victor.

=== Copying works ===
After the populated circle of passionate art collectors had formed, the Greek originals were no longer sufficient to meet the demand. A mass copy trade was started. Statues and paintings inspired by classical pieces were imported from the Neo-Attic workshops in Athens.

=== Eclecticism ===
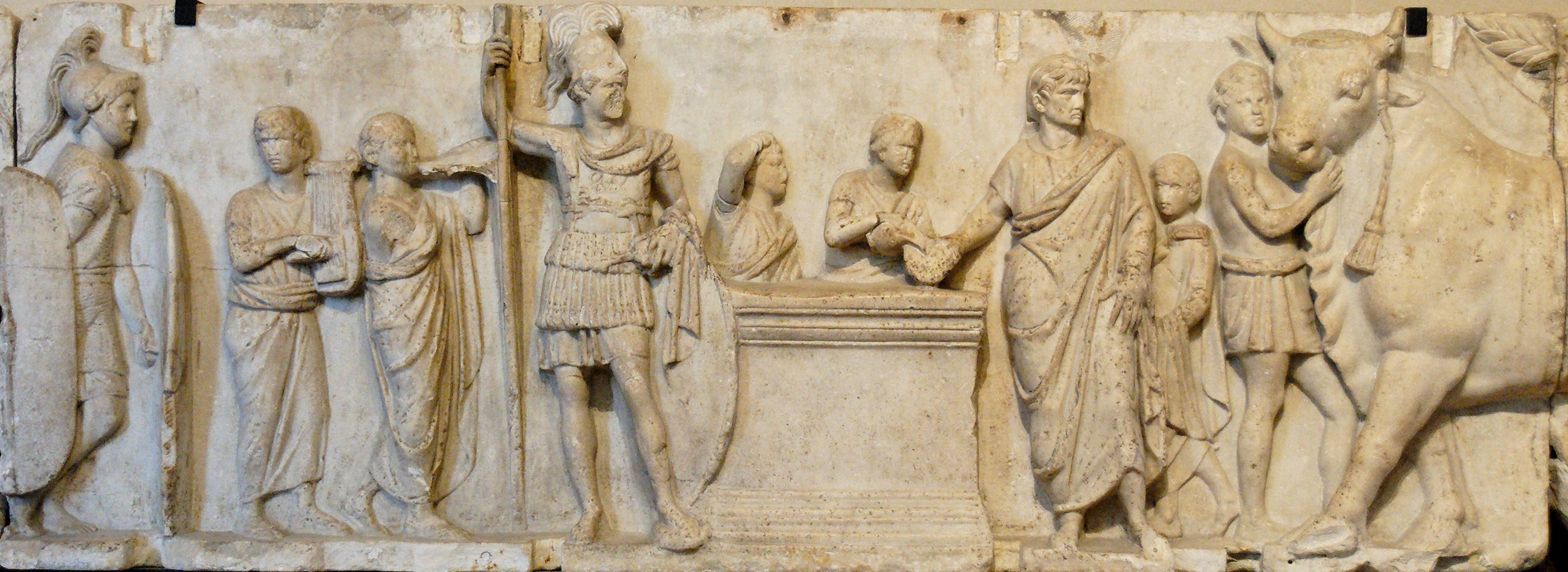
Altar of Domitius Ahenobarbus

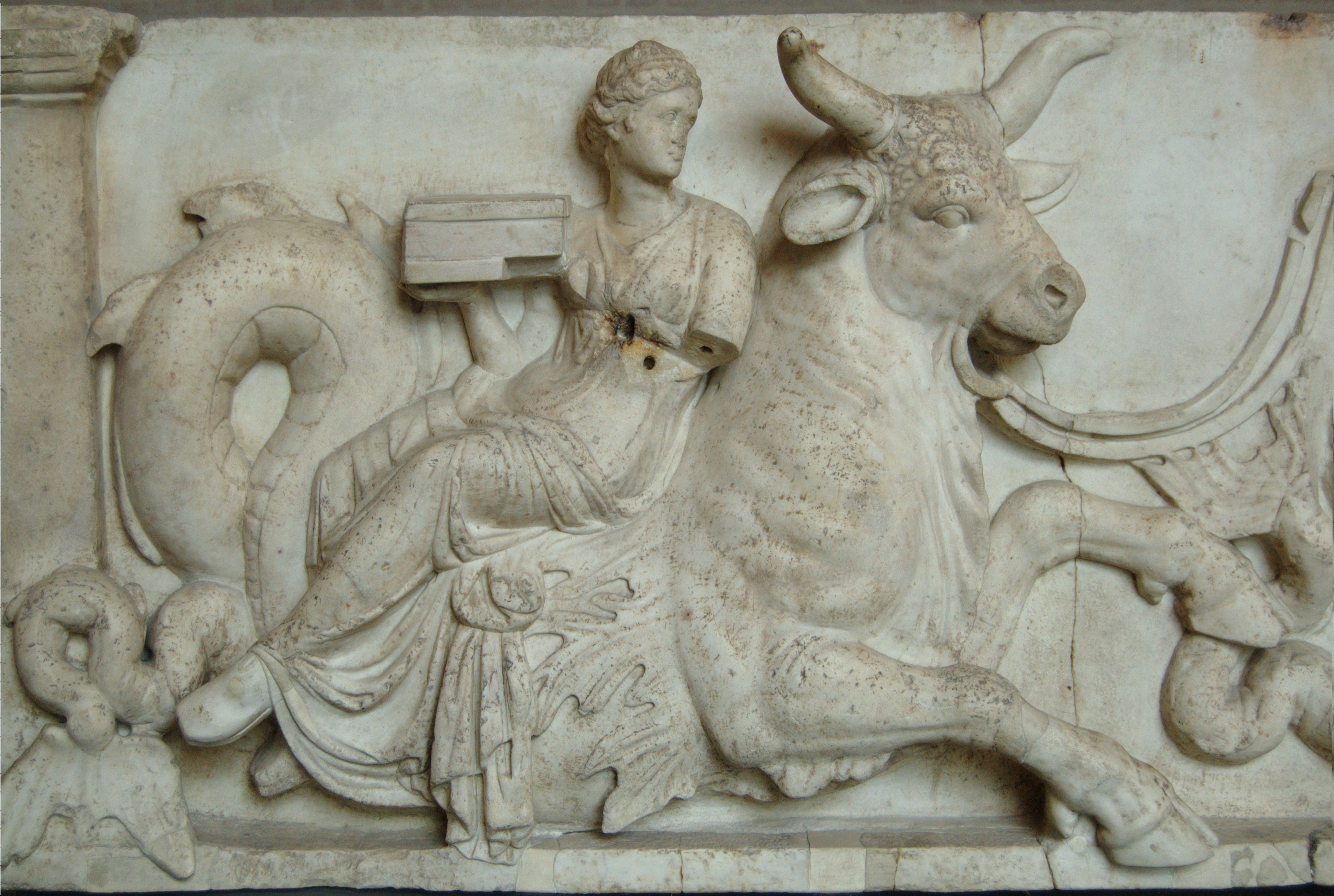
Thiasos

Naturally, after the huge influx of foreign art in Rome, coming from different schools and referring to very different periods, a certain amount of time was needed to assimilate and begin to understand these artistic legacies. As Romans attempted to interpret this foreign art, they developed distinctly eclectic characteristics. Early Roman originals saw the presence of contrasting styles within the same work, influenced by several different cultures simultaneously. This is apparent in the Altar of Domitius Ahenobarbus and Ara Pacis.

=== Triumphal painting ===
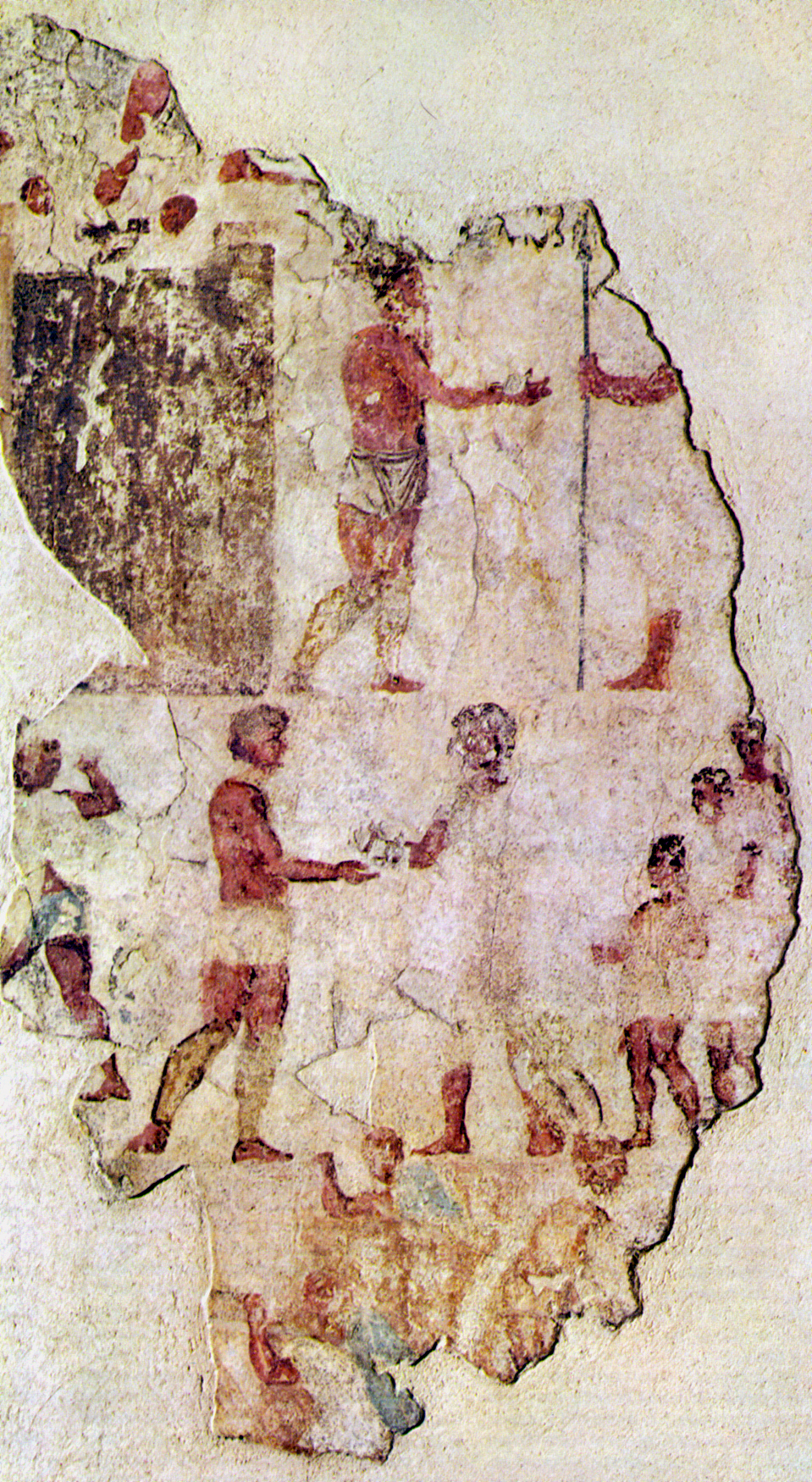
Fresco with historical scene from the Esquiline Necropolis, one of the first examples of Roman fresco painting

At the end of the fourth century, a painter Fabius Pictor was active in the decoration of the Temple of Salus in 304 BC. Painting at that time had a mainly practical, ornamental and, above all, celebratory purpose. It has been hypothesized that Fabius' decoration was of a narrative and historical nature, and that Republican painting with scenes from the Samnite Wars in the Esquiline Necropolis could be derived from these works.

From the third century BC, there is documentation of "triumphal" paintings, that is, paintings brought to the triumph parades with the narratives of events of the victorious military campaign or the appearance of the conquered cities. Triumphal painting was influential on Roman historical reliefs.

== Age of Sulla and Caesar ==
From 130 BC, through the dictatorship of Sulla, and up to the first consulate of Caesar in 59 BC, Rome had developed its own political and cultural ideology.

In these years sees the birth of clearly identifiable Roman artistic culture. When contact with art became usual for a Roman citizen, the new "Roman" artistic identity with its own characteristics began to develop.

After Sulla rose to power in 92 BC, Rome saw the most remarkable innovations in architecture, wall painting, and in the formation of realistic portraiture.

=== Architecture ===
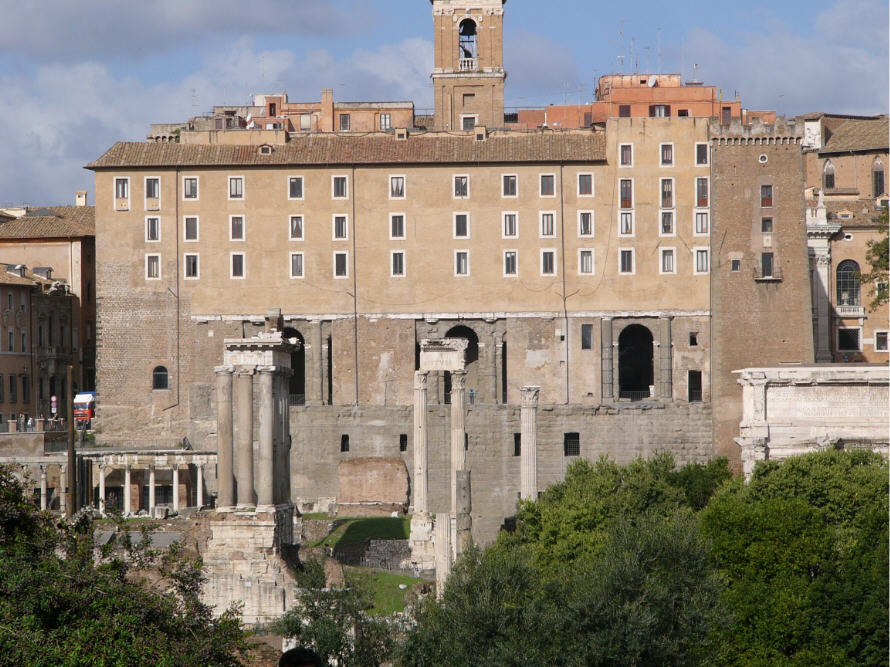
Remains of the Tabularium (in the background, under the Palazzo Senatorio)

During the reign of Sulla, the traditional wooden structures with Etruscan terracotta cladding or stuccoed tuff gave way to buildings built of travertine or other limestone. This was influenced by Hellenistic architecture, but adapted to a simpler, more modest form. The architectural elements had been raised from strictly pragmatic, allowing a decorative use that gave great freedom to architects.

At the time of the Macedonian wars, the first marble buildings were constructed in Rome. Lucius Licinius Crassus, relative of the more famous Marcus Licinius Crassus, was the first to use marble in the decoration of his private home on the Palatine Hill in 100 BC.

After the fire of 83 BC, the Temple of Jupiter Optimus Maximus was rebuilt with stone, with marble columns from Athens and with a new chryselephantine simulacrum of Jupiter. The construction of the Tabularium dates back to 78 BC. This building had semi-columns leaning against the pillars from which the arches started. This scheme was also used in the Sanctuary of Hercules Victor in Tivoli.

After Caesar rose to power, there was the creation of his great Forum of Caesar and the Temple of Venus Genetrix.

=== Portraiture ===
Roman Republican portraiture is characterized by verism influenced by Hellenistic portraiture, and survives mainly as marble and bronze sculpture. Roman portrait busts are thought to derive in part from death masks or funerary commemorations, as elite Romans displayed ancestral images (imagines) in the atrium of their home (domus).

Portraiture in Republican Rome was a way of establishing societal legitimacy and achieving status through one's family and background. Exploits wrought by one's ancestors earned them and their families public approbation, and more; a pompous state funeral paid for by the state. Wax masks would be cast from the family member while they were still living, which made for hyper-realistic visual representations of the individual literally lifted from their face. These masks would be kept in the houses of male descendants in memory of the ancestors once they had passed. These masks served as a sort of family track record, and could get the descendants positions and perks, similar to a child of two alumni attending their alma mater.

Republican Rome embraced imperfection in portraiture because, though there were different levels of power each class of society had, everybody had little insecurities, this type of untouched physical representation fostered a sense of community by implying that while there were existing inequalities, that did not change the fact that they were Romans.

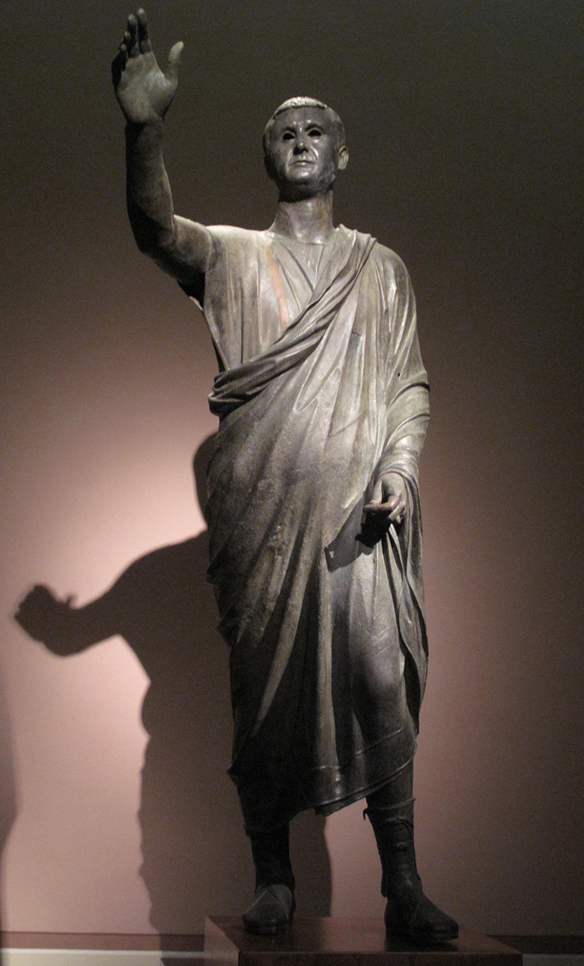
The Orator, c. 100 BC, an Etrusco-Roman bronze statue depicting Aule Metele (Latin: Aulus Metellus), an Etruscan man wearing a Roman toga while engaged in rhetoric; the statue features an inscription in the Etruscan alphabet

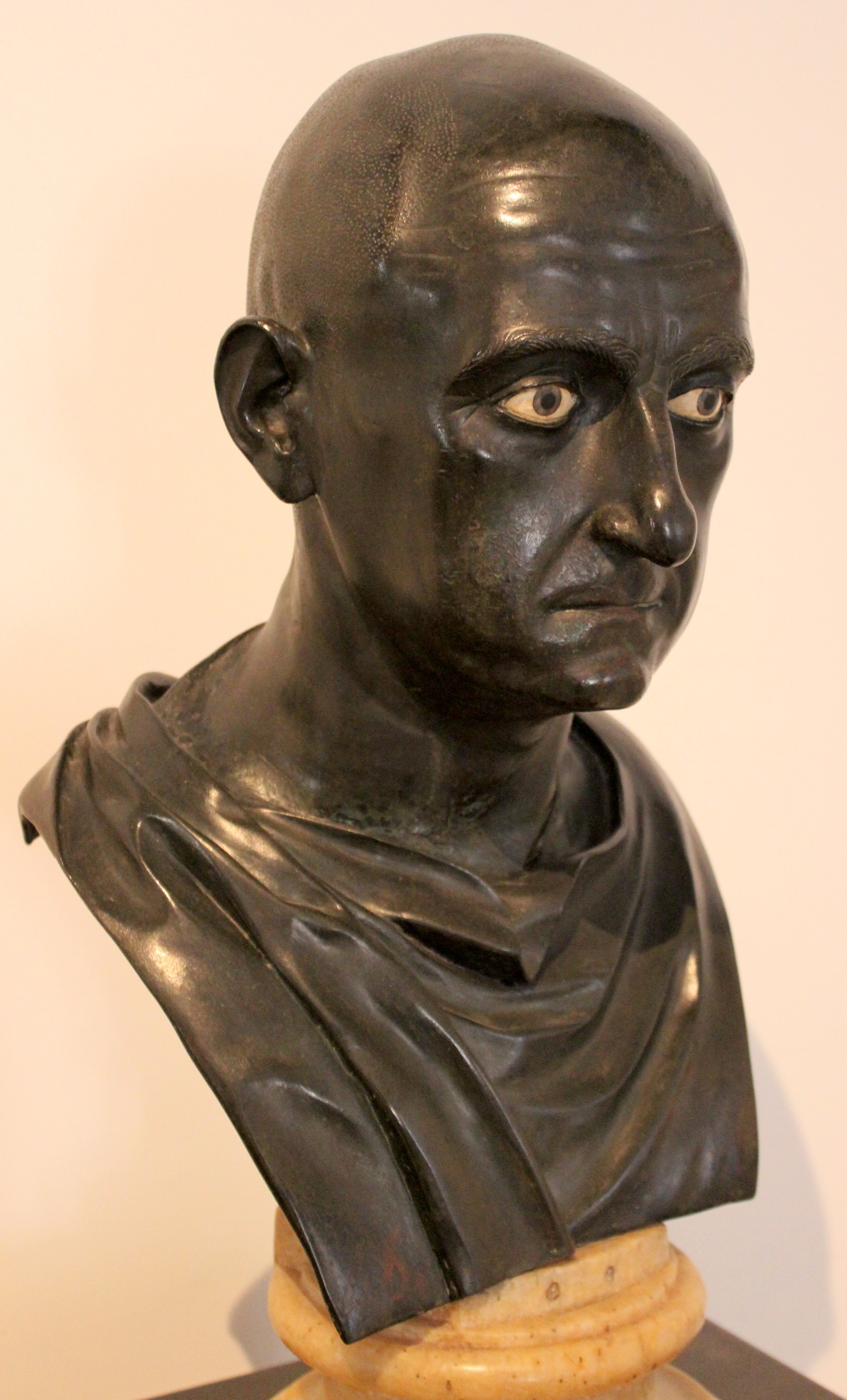
Isis priest, bronze bust, mid 1st century BC

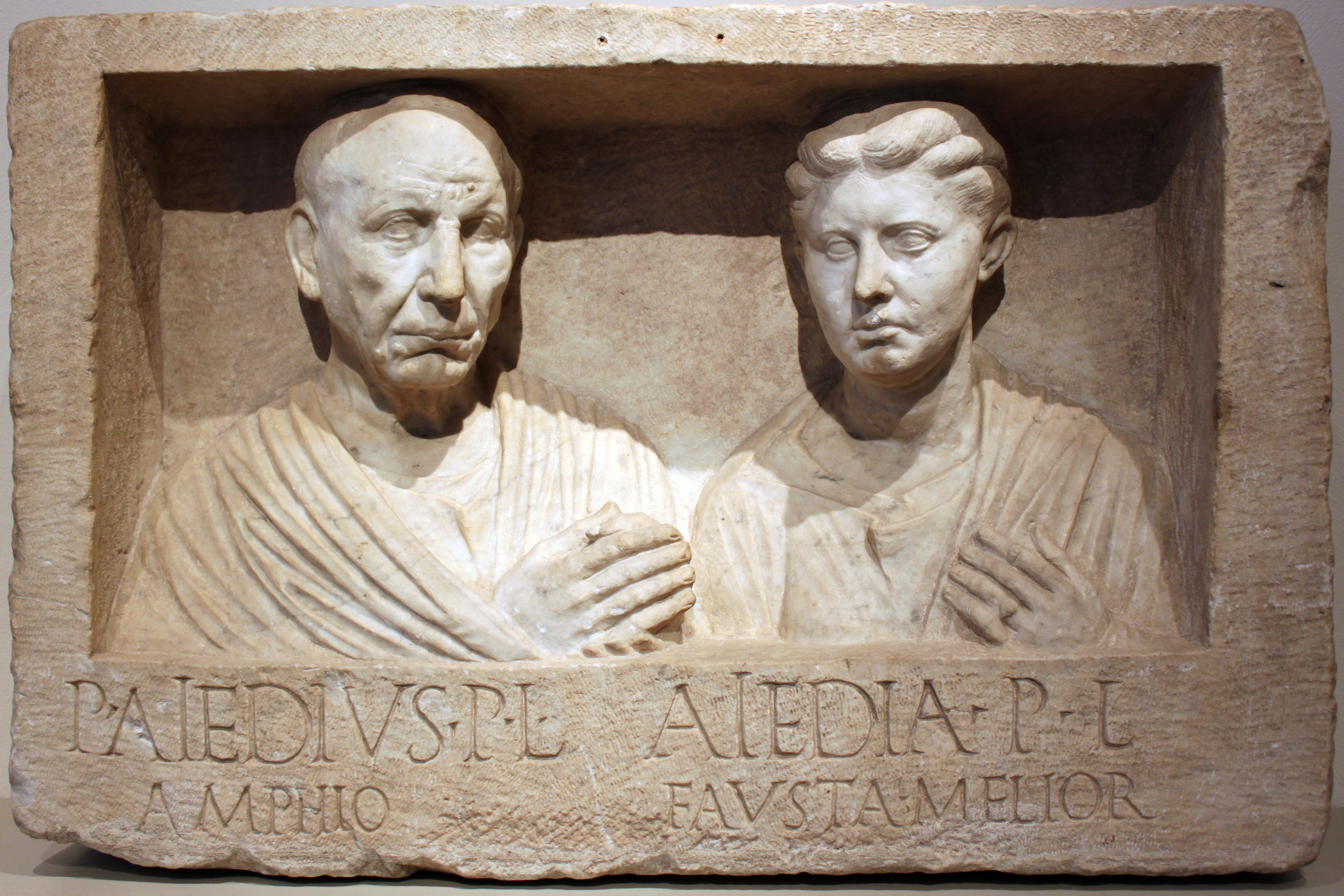
The Grave relief of Publius Aiedius and Aiedia, 30 BC, Pergamon Museum (Berlin)

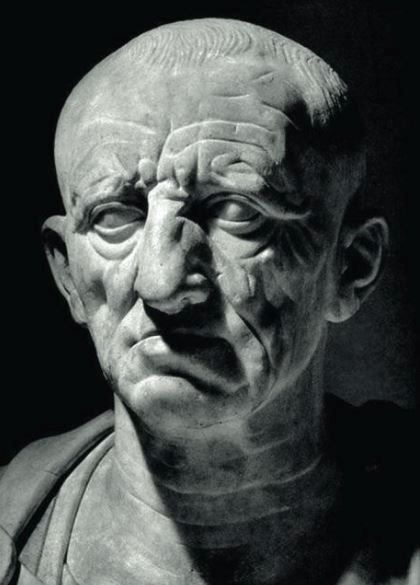
The Patrician Torlonia bust depicting Cato the Elder, 1st century BC

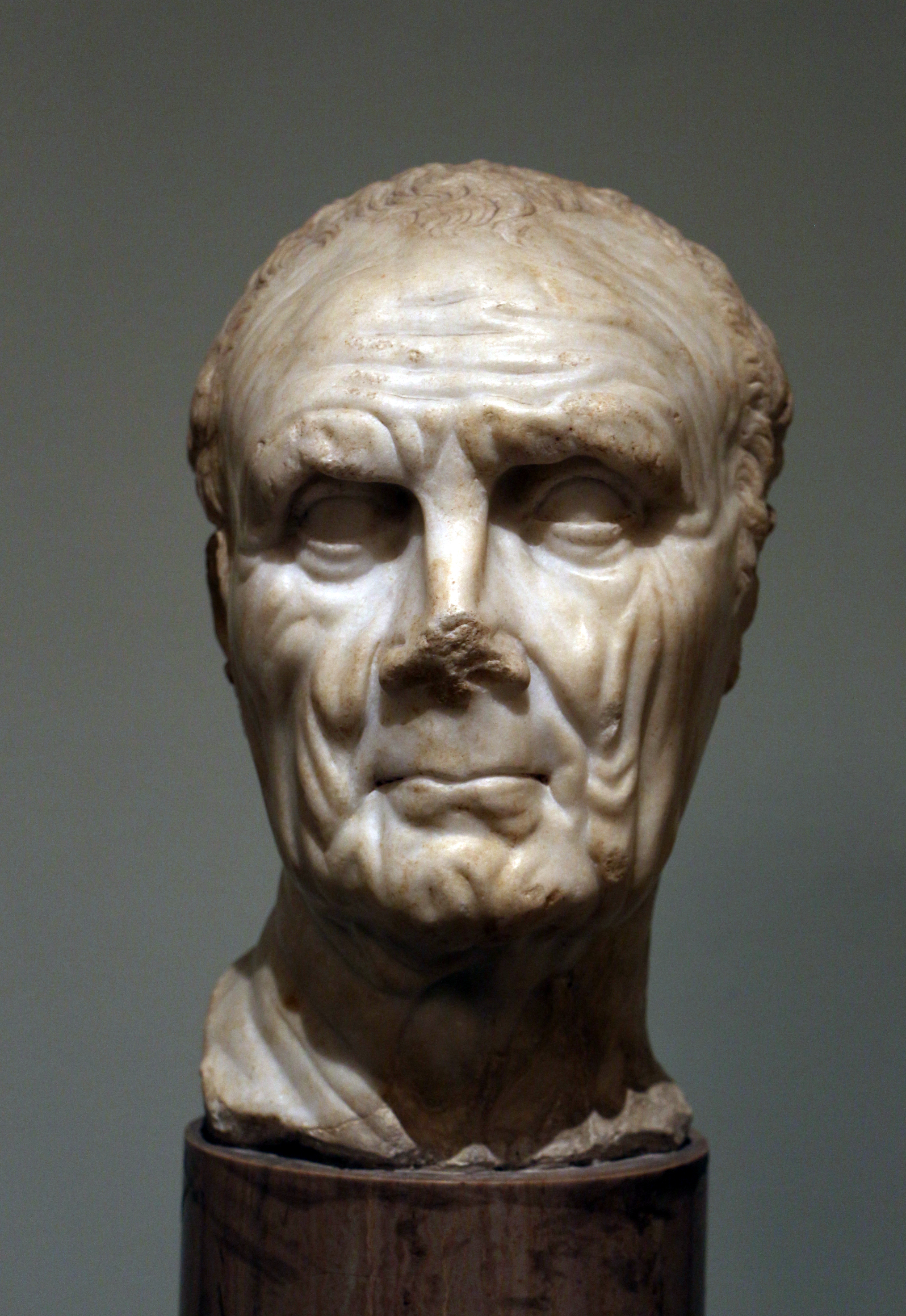
The Osimo head, 1st century BC

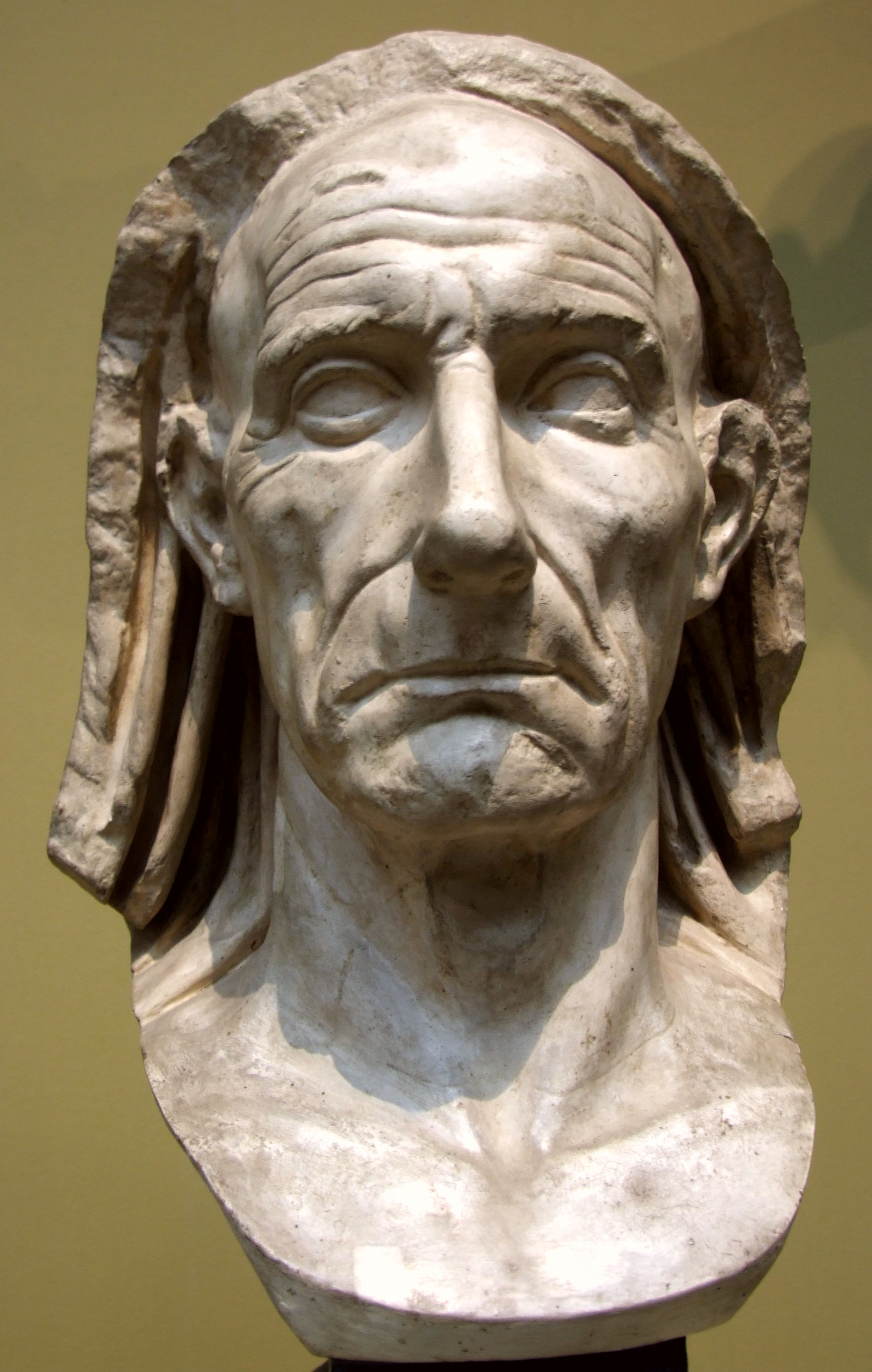
Veristic portrait bust of an old man, head covered (capite velato), either a priest or paterfamilias (marble, mid-1st century BC)

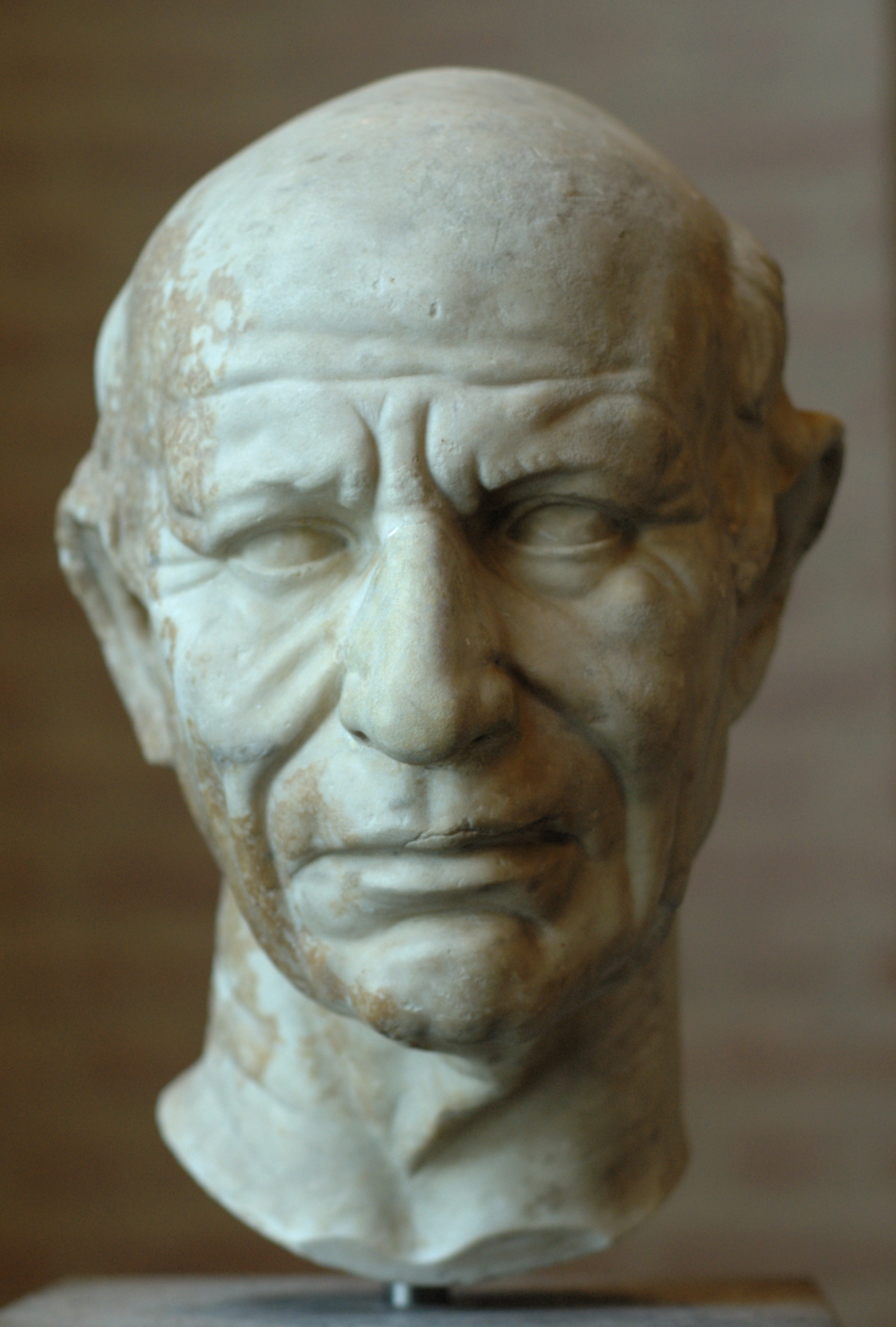
Head of an old Roman, c. 60 BC. The realistic rendering of old age (baldness, face and neck wrinkles) corresponds to the esthetic ideal of the end Republic.

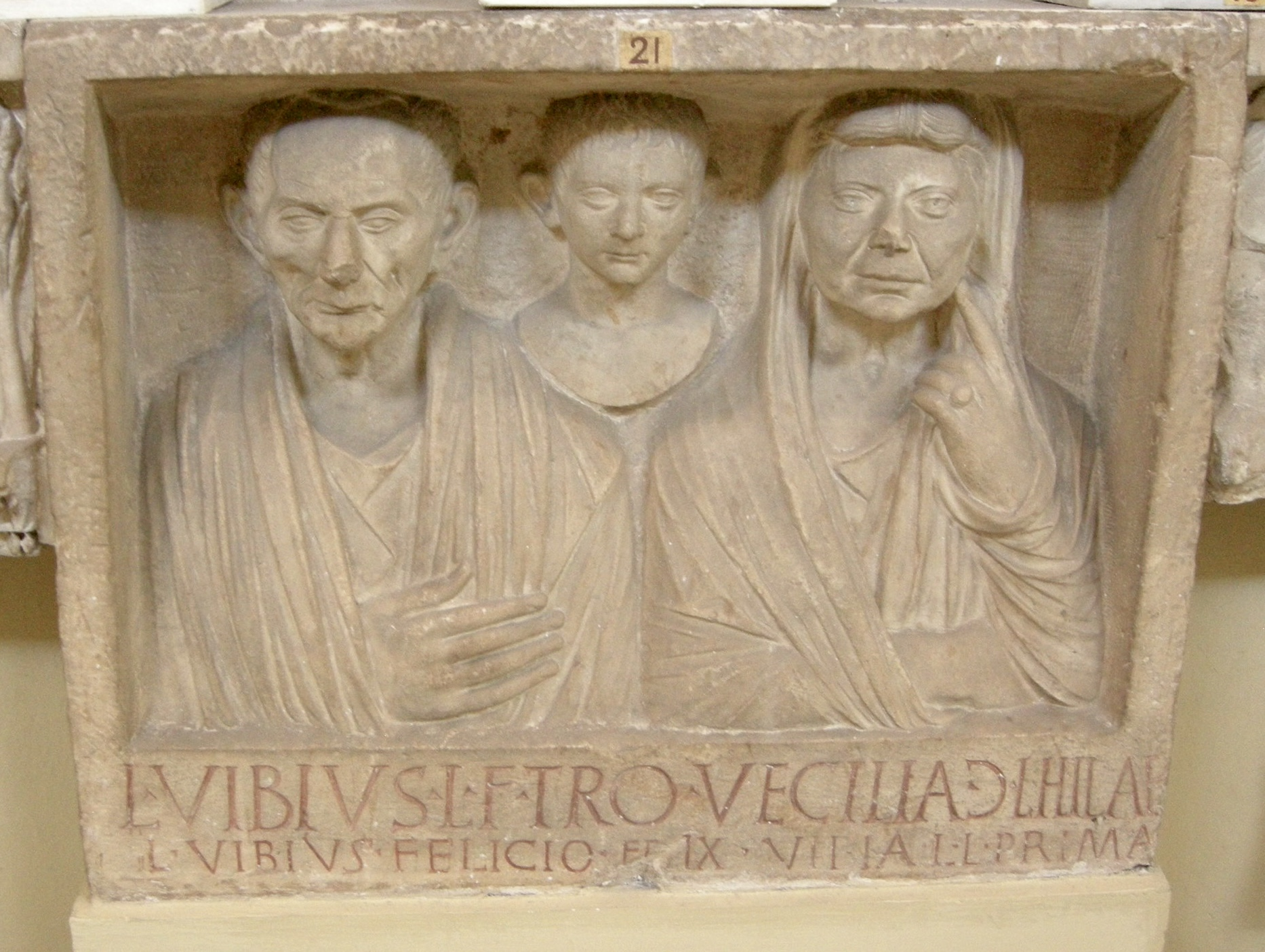
A funerary relief with members of the gens Vibia, late 1st century BC.

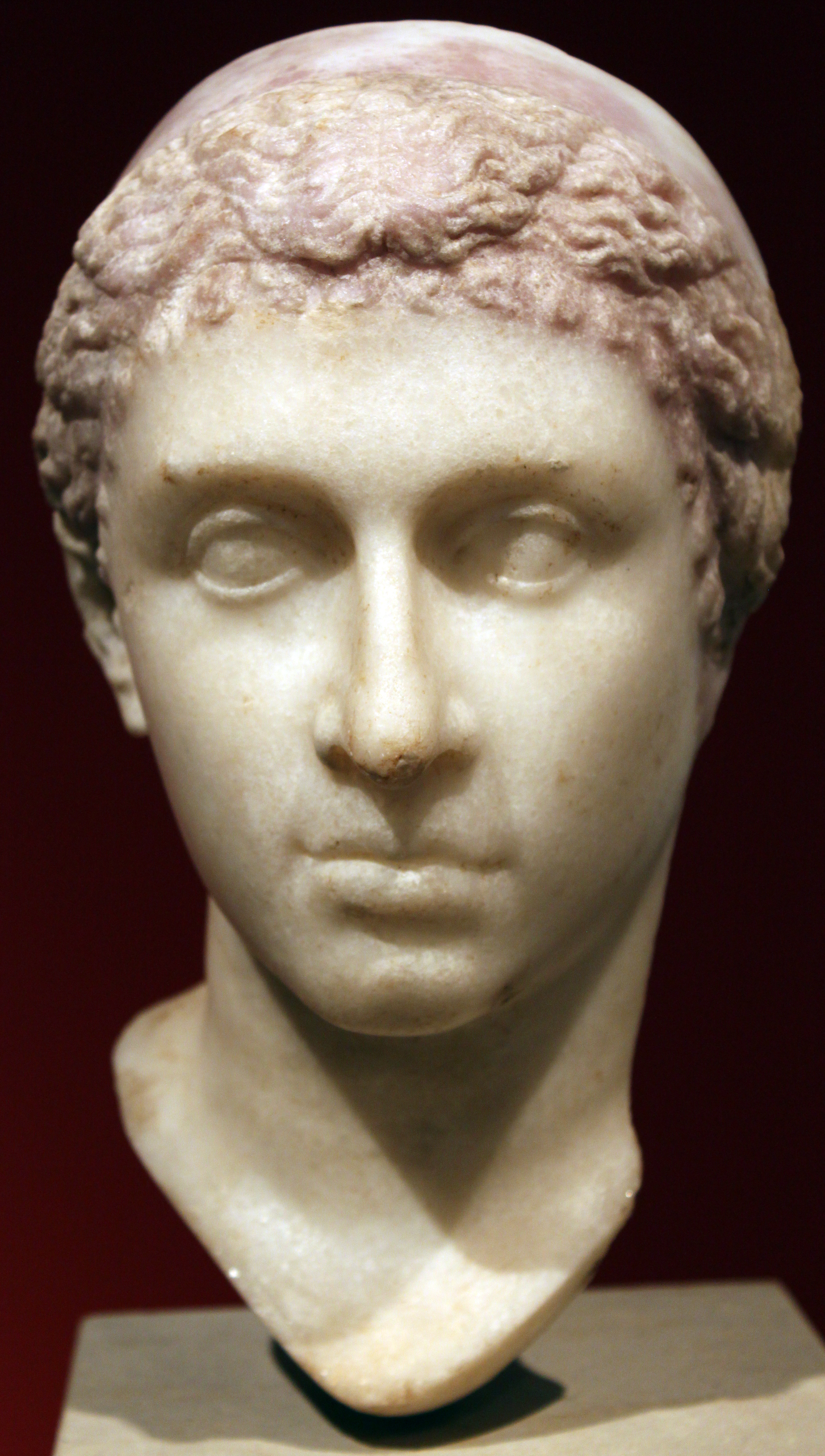
A Roman marble bust of Cleopatra VII of Ptolemaic Egypt, c. 50-30 BC (around the time of her visit to Rome with Julius Caesar)

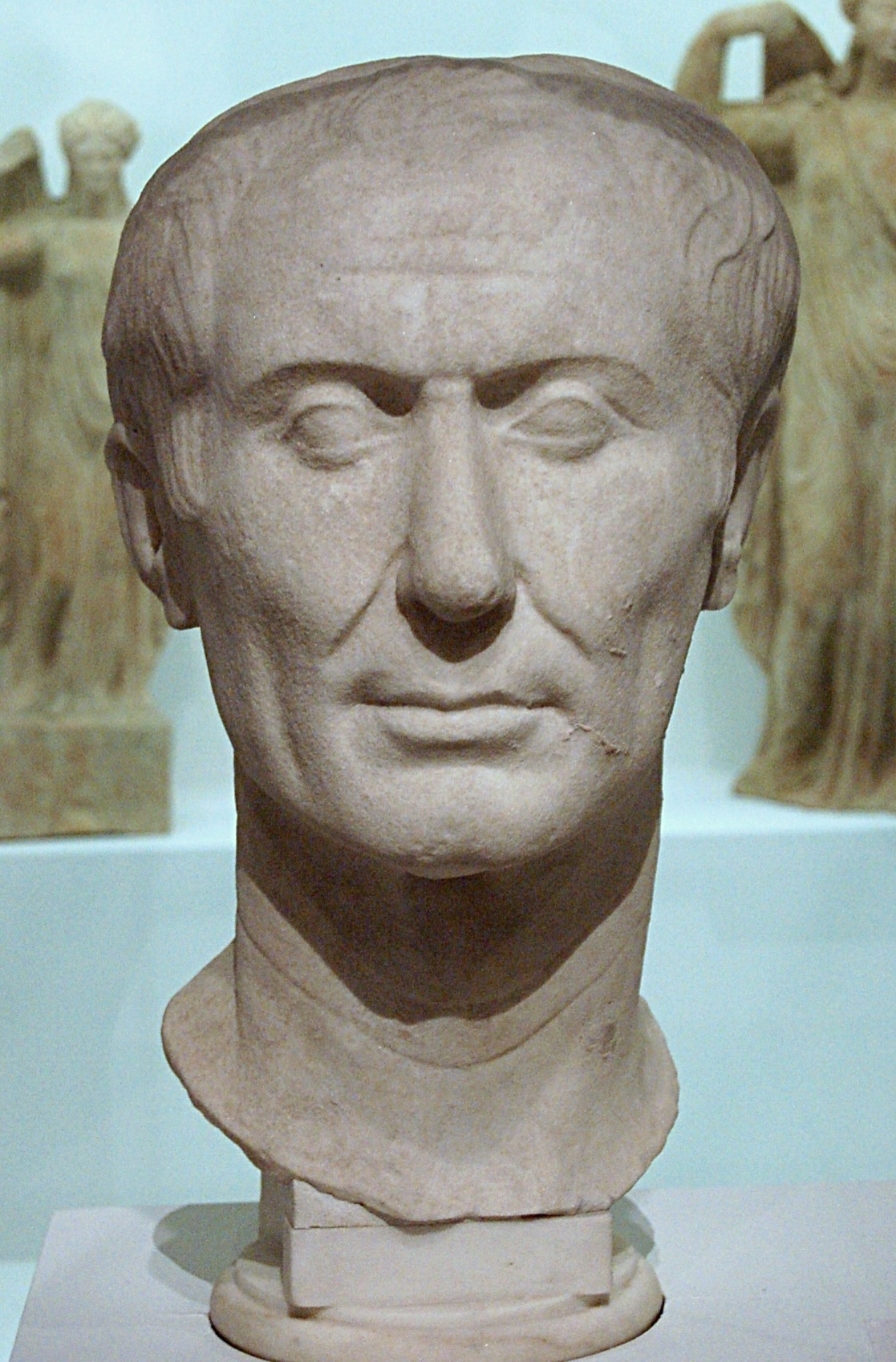
The Tusculum portrait of Julius Caesar, 50–40 BC

=== Painting ===
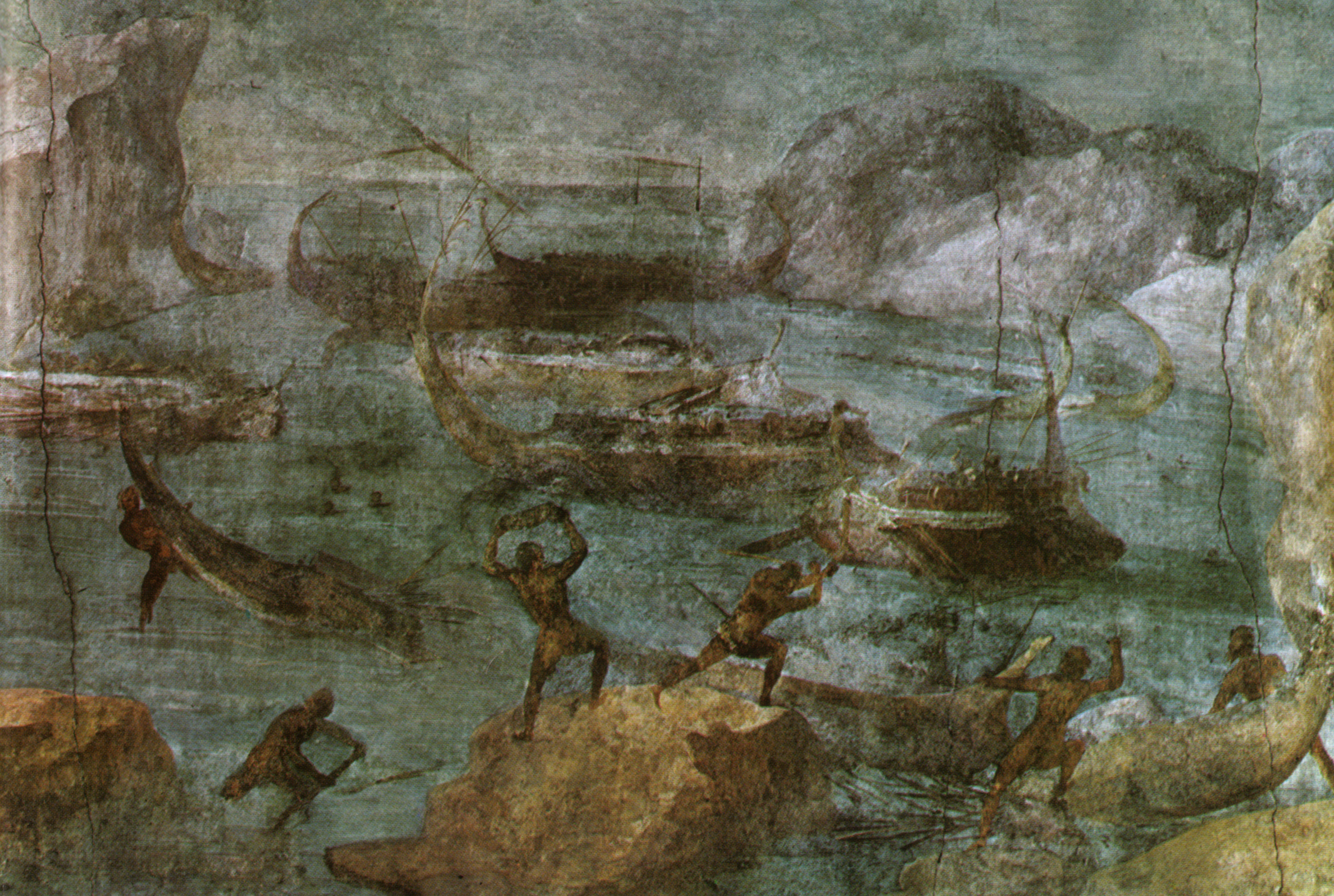
Scene from the Odyssey (Attack of the Laestrygonians)

This period is defined by a Roman painting style called Pompeian, named such due to the studies of the conspicuous finds of Pompeii.

Along with the sculptures, numerous Greek paintings had arrived in Italy. Many painters had moved to Rome from Greece, Syria, and Alexandria. Pliny the Elder denounced the decadence of painting.

It was typical for a stately home to have every corner of the wall painted, with extraordinary quantity of pictorial decorations. These works, however, were not the result of the Roman inventiveness, but were a last remnant of purely Greek artistry.

Among the most interesting examples of the time there are the frescoes with scenes of the Odyssey from the Via Graziosa house, dating from 50 to 40 BC. These were most likely copies made (with some errors, as in the Greek names of the characters) of an Alexandrian original dating from around 150 BC.

=== Mosaic ===
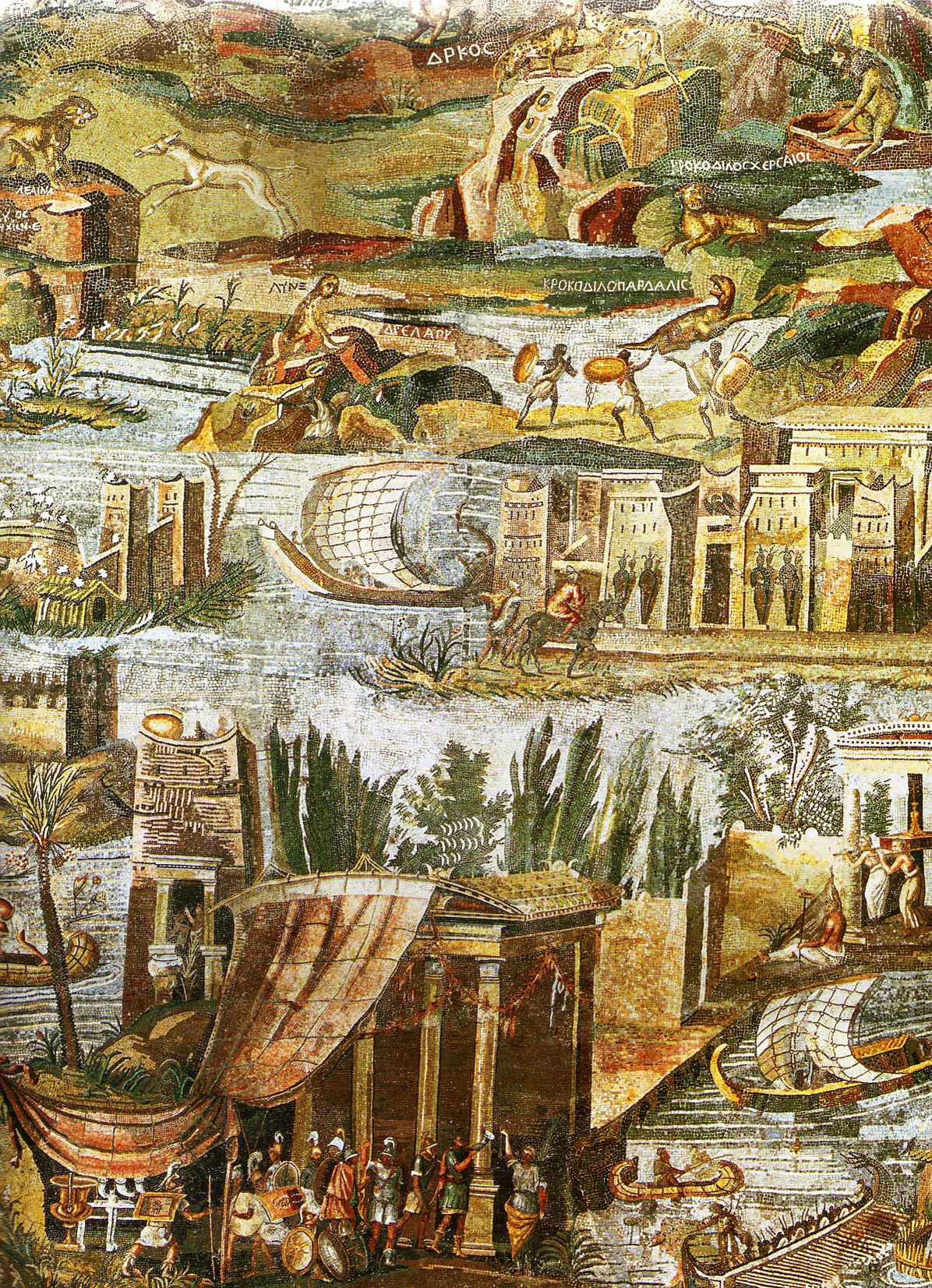
The Nile mosaic of Palestrina

The first evidence of mosaic tiles in Rome dates back to the end of the third century BC. Mosaic art was used practically as a means to waterproof the clay floors and make it more resistant to trampling. Eventually, cultural exchanges with Greece and Egypt changed the aesthetics and compositions developed. Greek workers brought classic mosaic motifs, including doves and scenes from the Nile.

The wall mosaic was born at the end of the Republic, towards the first century BC. In Pompeii and Herculaneum, mosaics were used to waterproof exedras, as they were often decorated with fountains.

One of the most notable examples of mosaic from this period is the Nile mosaic of Palestrina. It is an accurate depiction of the course of the Nile, with scenes of hunting, fishing, rituals and banquets.

== Notable artists ==
The list of notable Roman artists from the period includes:

- Alexander, metalworker
- Arellius, painter
- Argelius, architect
- Cyrus, architect
- Iaia, painter
- Gaius Fabius Pictor, painter
- Hermodorus of Salamis, architect
- Pacuvius, painter

== Bibliography ==
- (in Italian) Ranuccio Bianchi Bandinelli & Mario Torelli, L'arte dell'antichità classica, Etruria-Roma, Utet, Torino 1976.
- (in Italian) Pierluigi De Vecchi & Elda Cerchiari, I tempi dell'arte, volume 1, Bompiani, Milano 1999
