= Temple of Mars =

- Shown in ancient Rome
- Interactive map of Temple of Mars
- 41°53′33″N 12°28′37″E

The Temple of Mars (Latin: Aedes Martis in Circo) was a temple built on the campus Martius in Rome in the 2nd century BC, near the Circus Flaminius, dedicated to Mars.

The consul Decimus Junius Brutus Callaicus vowed a temple to Mars in 138 BC and construction began after 135 BC, financed by booty from his campaign in Hispania. It was designed by Hermodorus of Salamis and was dedicated in 132 BC during Junius' triumph. It was restored in the late Republic, retaining its original plan and features. If still in use by the 4th-century, the temple would have been closed during the persecution of pagans in the late Roman Empire, when the Christian Emperors issued edicts prohibiting non-Christian worship.

== See also ==
- List of Ancient Roman temples

== Bibliography ==
- Samuel Ball Platner and Thomas Ashby, A topographical dictionary of Ancient Rome, Oxford University Press, 1929
- Filippo Coarelli, Rome and environs : an archaeological guide, University of California Press, 2007
