= Navalia (Rome) =

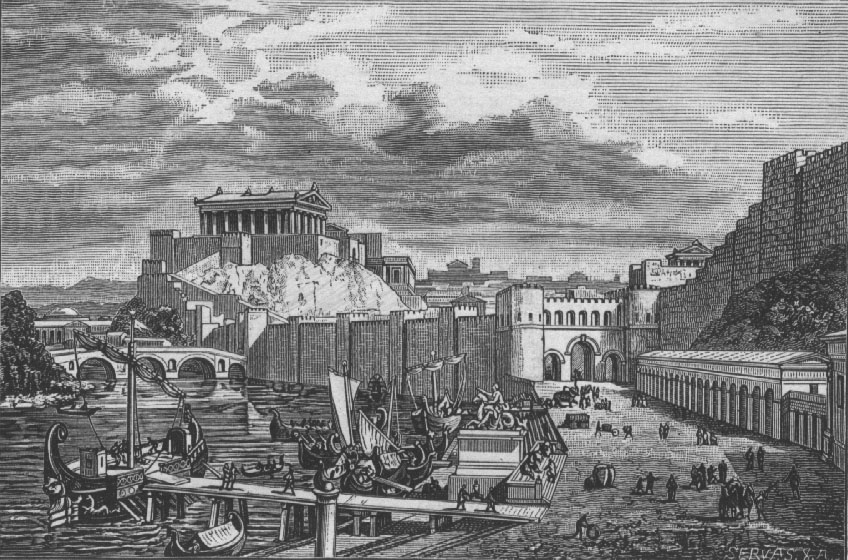

The Navalia was a military port of Ancient Rome which may also have included a naval dockyard. It is thought to have been sited on the left bank of the river Tiber to the south of the Campus Martius and is sometimes called the 'Navalia superiora' to distinguish it from another military port further down the Tiber near the Forum Boarium (the 'Navalia inferiora'). The structures, probably gable roofed shipsheds of the period, were also mentioned as being used to hold hostages and circus animals, perhaps during the later period where silting meant navigation on the upper Tiber had become difficult.

== History ==
In his book Ab urbe condita, Livy mentions the presence of "the docks at Rome". These are paired with consular names that suggest dates in the middle of the fourth century BCE, the earliest mentions we have. These docks appear to have been active throughout the republican period with its greatest activity between 146–135 BCE. They were clearly important, as indicated by an expansion project in the second century BCE that attracted the talent of the Greek architect Hermodorus of Salamis, then actively involved in several high-profile buildings. The Navalia appears to have been destroyed in 44 BCE and not subsequently rebuilt.

== Location ==
The exact location is unknown but the consensus view south of the Campus Martius is supported a passage in Plutarch mentioning the younger Cato returning from Cyprus in triumph. The text is helpfully descriptive: he is described as sailing through Rome on the Tiber, ignoring cheering crowds lining the river and not stopping before reaching "the dockyard". From there he parades his spoils through the Forum. This appears to imply downstream locations where he could have disembarked, either the Emporium or an earlier structure near the Forum Boarium, and supports the location for the Navalia adjacent to the Campus Martius.

== Bibliography ==
- Lawrence Richardson, A New Topographical Dictionary of Ancient Rome, Johns Hopkins University Press, 1992
- Filippo Coarelli, Rome and environs: an archaeological guide, University of California Press, Berkeley, 2003
