= Capitoline Brutus =

Ancient Roman bronze bust

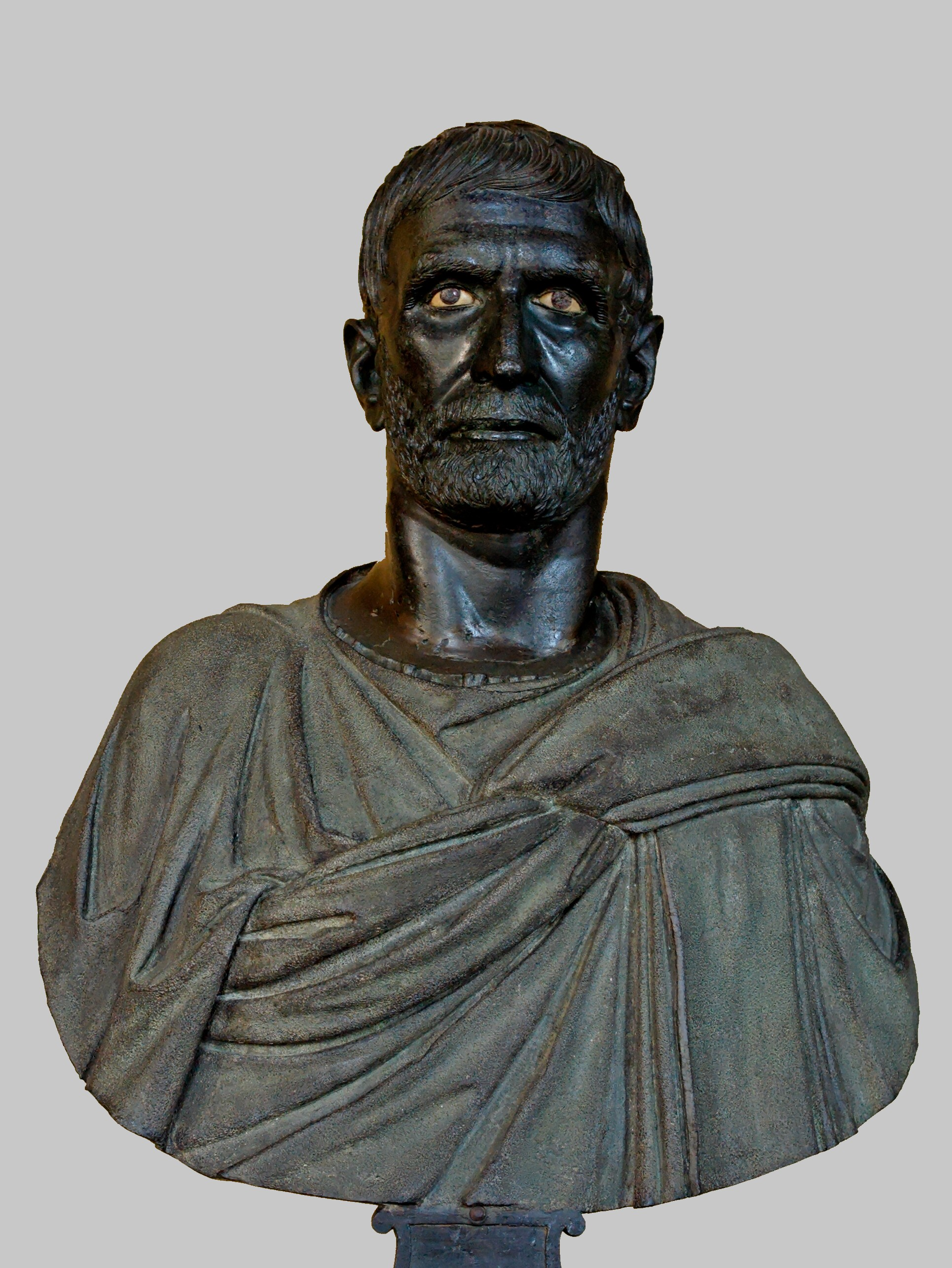
"Capitoline Brutus", bronze portrait head, glass-inlaid bone eyes, late 4th to early 3rd centuries BC, on a 16th-century bronze bust

The Capitoline Brutus is an ancient Roman bronze bust that is traditionally, but probably wrongly, thought to be an imagined portrait of the Roman consul Lucius Junius Brutus (d. 509 BC). The bust has historically been dated to the late 4th to early 3rd centuries BC, but is perhaps as late as the 2nd century BC, or early 1st century BC.

The bust is 69 cm (27 in) in height and is now in the Hall of the Triumphs within the Capitoline Museums, Rome. Traditionally taken to be an early example of Roman portraiture and perhaps by an Etruscan artist influenced by Hellenistic art and contemporary Greek styles of portraiture, it may be "an archaizing work of the first century BC". The Roman head was provided with a toga-clad bronze bust during the Renaissance.

== History ==
The bust's modern history begins in Italy, during the 16th century; nothing is known of its previous history before then. It was bequeathed to the city of Rome by Cardinal Rodolfo Pio da Carpi in 1564. Its identification as a representation of the ancient Roman statesman Lucius Junius Brutus was first formulated by antiquarians who excavated and examined it during the Renaissance, based on their readings of Roman history. However, there is no direct evidence that it was made to represent Brutus.

The first drawing of the bust was made by the Dutch artist Maarten van Heemskerck sometime between 1532 and 1536, although it was first described in writing in 1549.

The bust was kept on the Capitoline Hill and from 1627 in the Palazzo dei Conservatori (Capitoline Museum), until Pope Pius VI surrendered it to the French First Republic in 1797. It was then used in the triumphal procession of Napoleon Bonaparte in Paris in July 1798. It was finally returned to Rome and the Palazzo dei Conservatori in 1816, where it has stayed ever since.

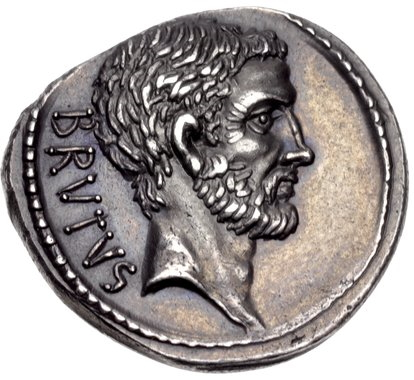
Portrait of Lucius Junius Brutus on a denarius of Marcus Junius Brutus minted in 54 BC.

== Antiquarian speculation ==
Speculation that the bust was meant to portray Lucius Junius Brutus of antiquity began with the writings of the 16th-century Italian naturalist Ulisse Aldrovandi. The Dutch 17th-century antiquary and editor of Lactantius Gallaeus Servatius alleged that a Roman coin minted during the consulship of Brutus bore similar facial features to the bust. The profile of the bust is similar to the profile on a coin, depicting Lucius Junius Brutus, minted by Marcus Junius Brutus following the assassination of Julius Caesar. The 18th-century German art historian Johann Joachim Winckelmann was not alone among his contemporaries in thinking the bust did not actually portray Brutus. The Italian antiquarian Ennio Quirino Visconti expressed doubt that it truly represented Brutus and was keen to emphasize that the head and bust were not originally made together or for each other. This was an idea that was first suggested in the 17th century when some antiquarians mused that the head originally belonged to a larger bronze statue that once stood on the Capitoline Hill.

== Modern scholarship ==
More recent scholars of the 20th century have been less concerned with whether or not it was an idealized portrait of Brutus and more preoccupied with the accurate dating and provenance of the bust. It has been identified as being Central Italian in origin with clear influence from Hellenistic-era Greek sculpture and portraiture of the first half of the 3rd century BC. It may come from a full-length statue. It may have honored a public figure during Rome's expansion in the 3rd century BC. However, it is possible it dates to "as late as the early first century BC when there was a vogue for creating lively imaginary 'portraits' of early Roman celebrities", which the "treatment of detail" suggests.

== Gallery ==
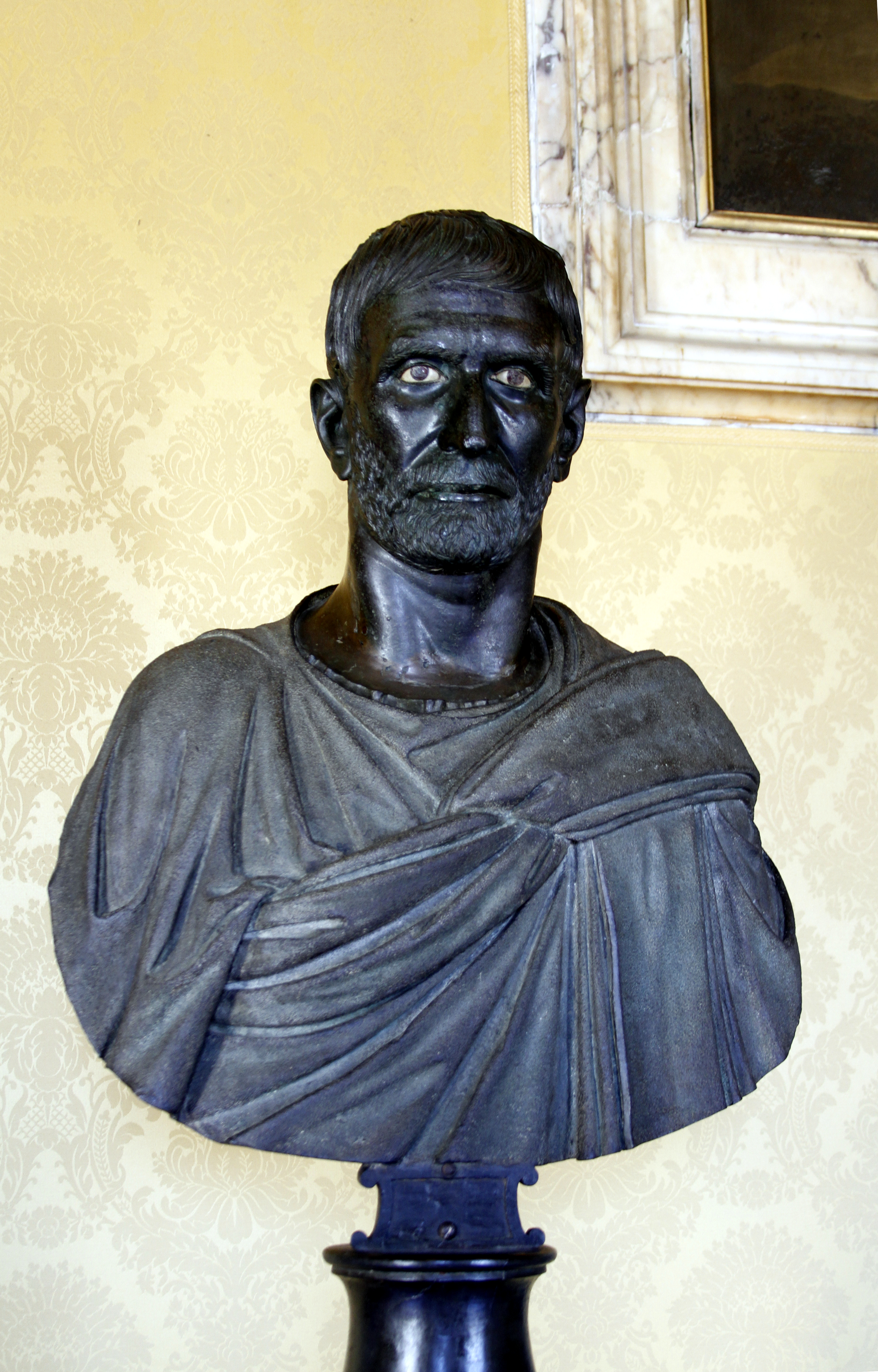

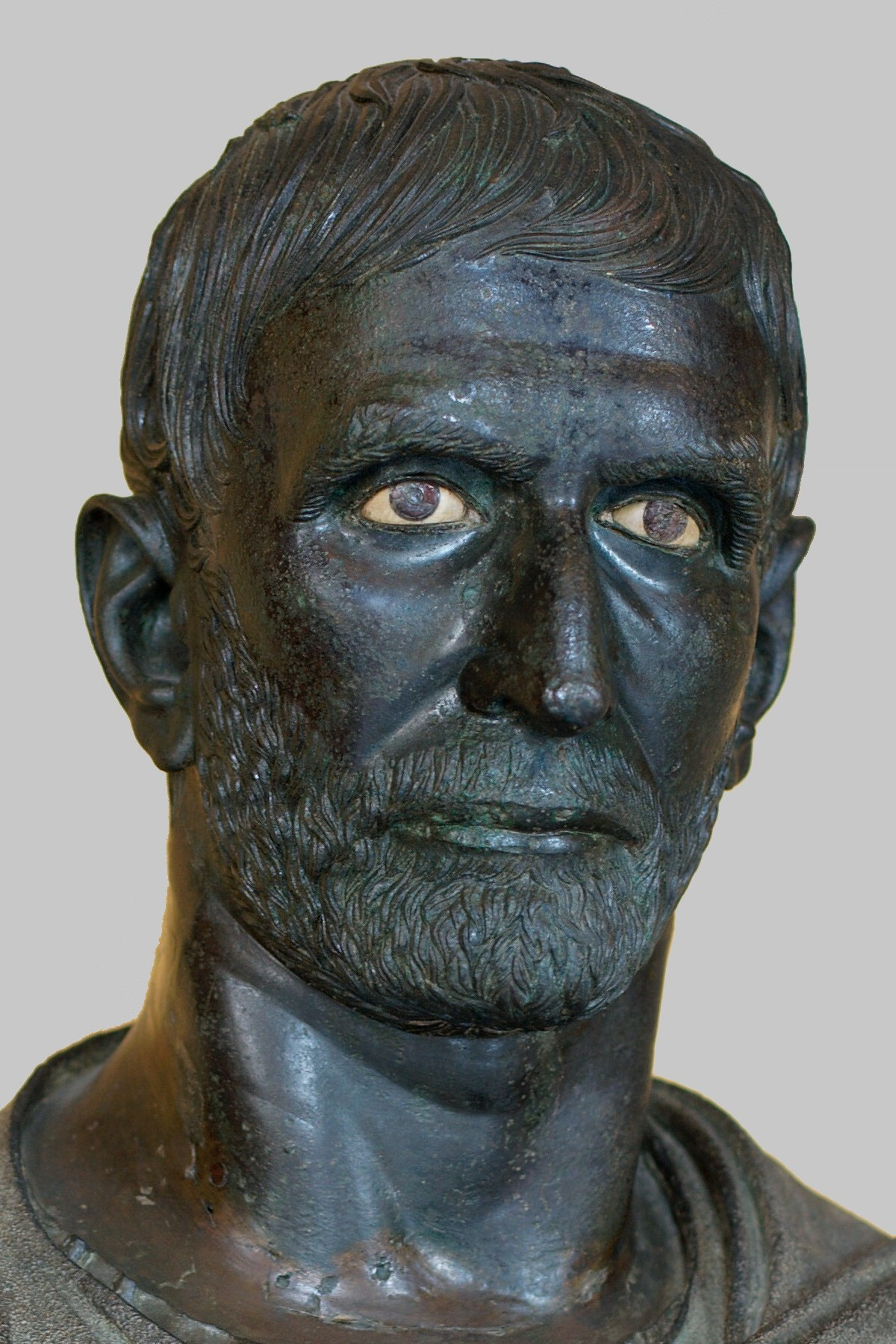

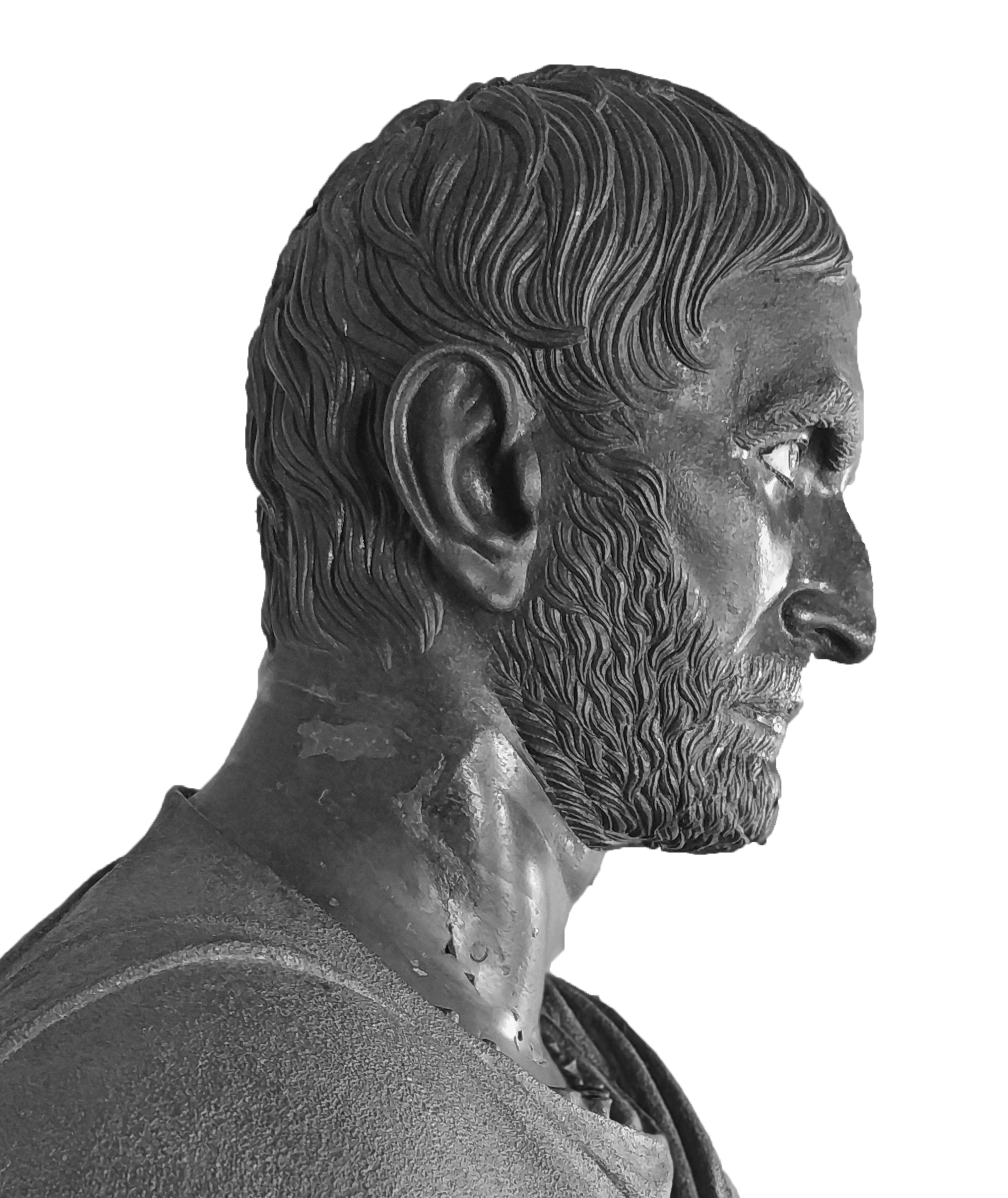

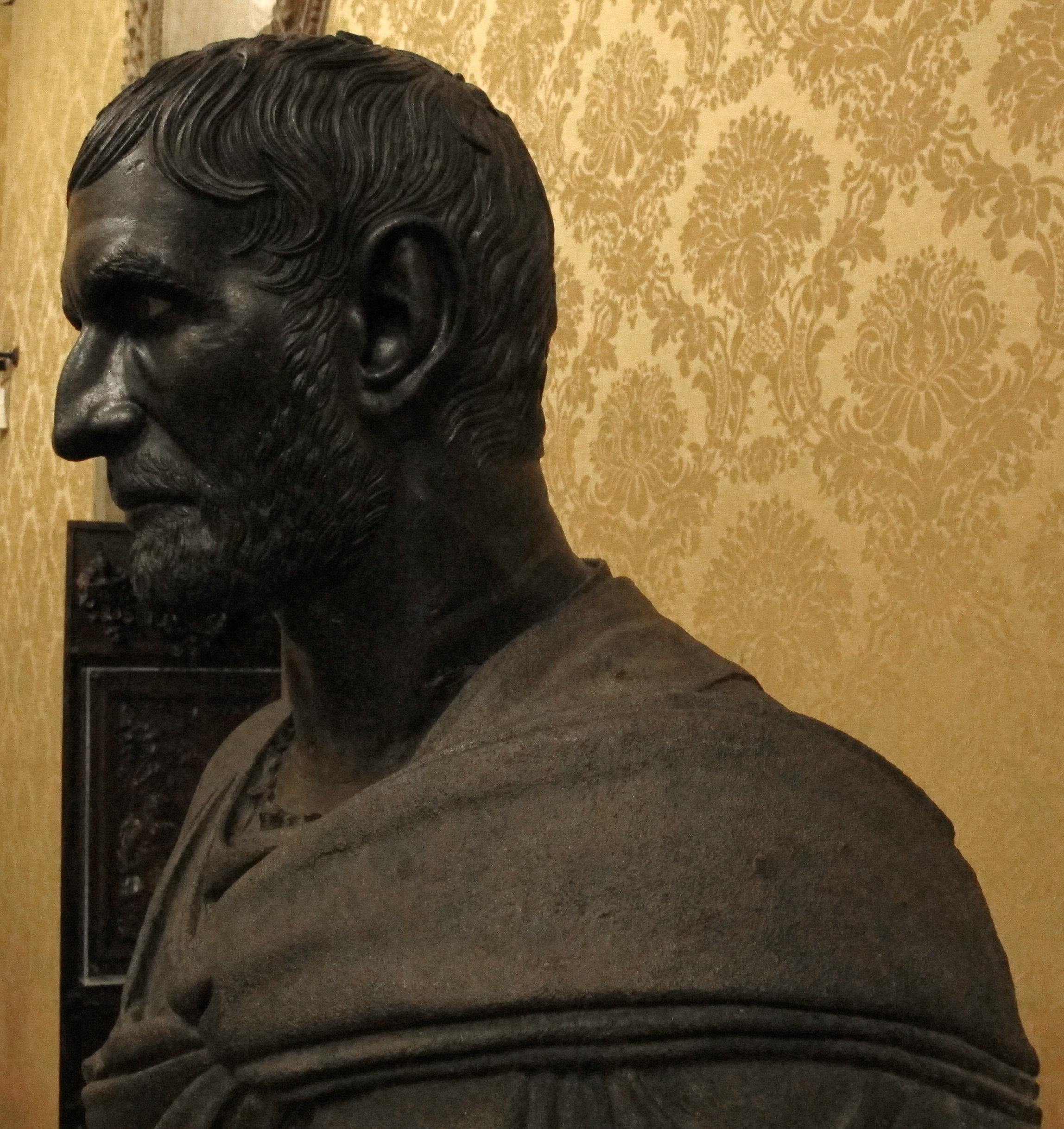

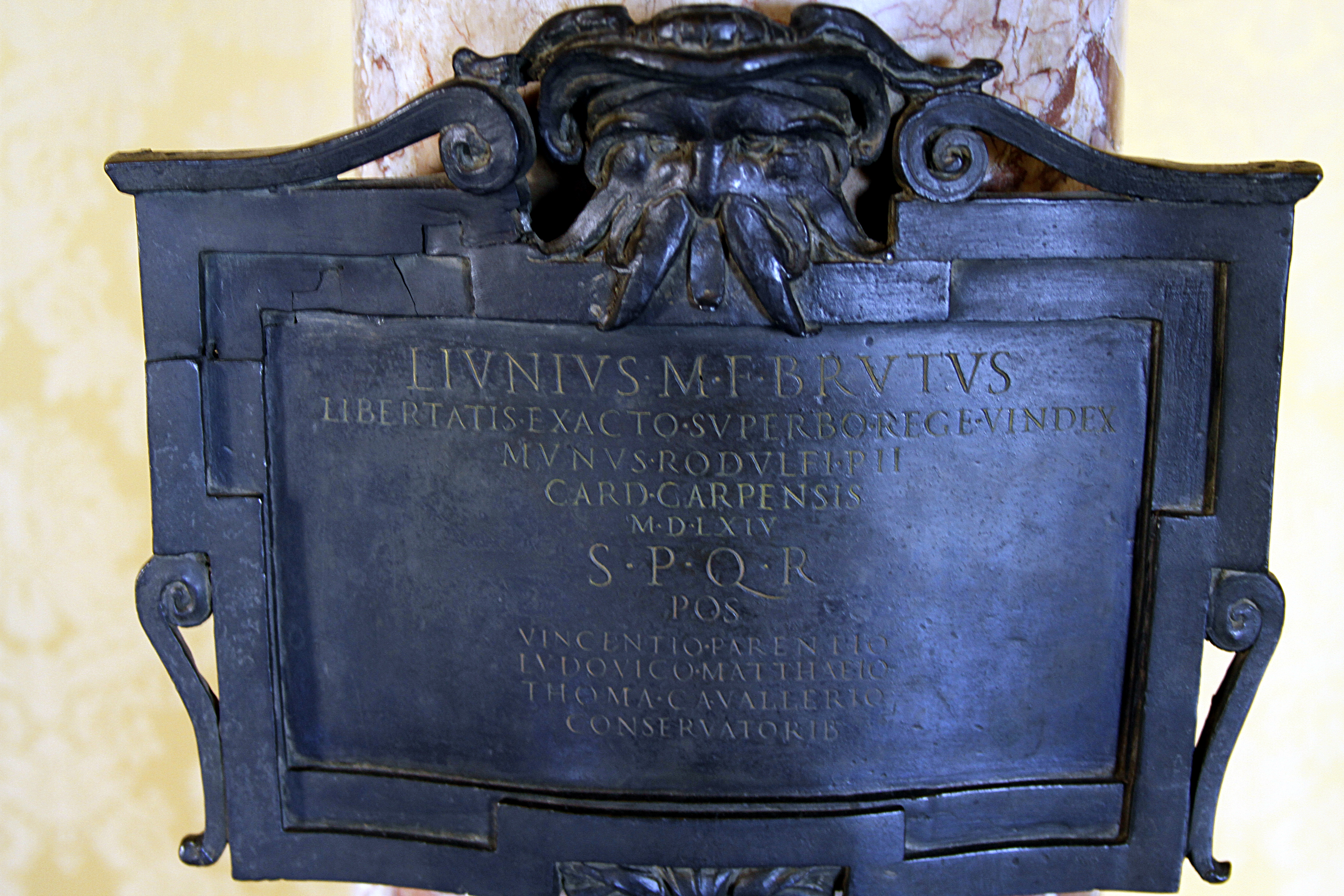

== See also ==
- Roman Republican art
- Roman sculpture
- The Orator

== Sources ==
- Brilliant, Richard. (2002). Portraiture, reprint edition. London: Reaktion Books Ltd.
- Crawford, Michael, (1974), Roman Republican Coinage, Cambridge University Press.
- Holliday, Peter. (1996). "Capitoline Brutus," in Nancy Thomson de Grummond (ed.) An Encyclopedia of the History of Classical Archaeology. Routledge: London & New York. ISBN 978-0313220661.
- Strong, Donald, et al., Roman Art, 1995 (2nd edn.), Yale University Press (Penguin/Yale History of Art), ISBN 0300052936

== Eternal references ==
- Capitoline Brutus: museicapitolini.org
