= The Orator =

Etruscan bronze sculpture

Aule Meteli (The Orator)
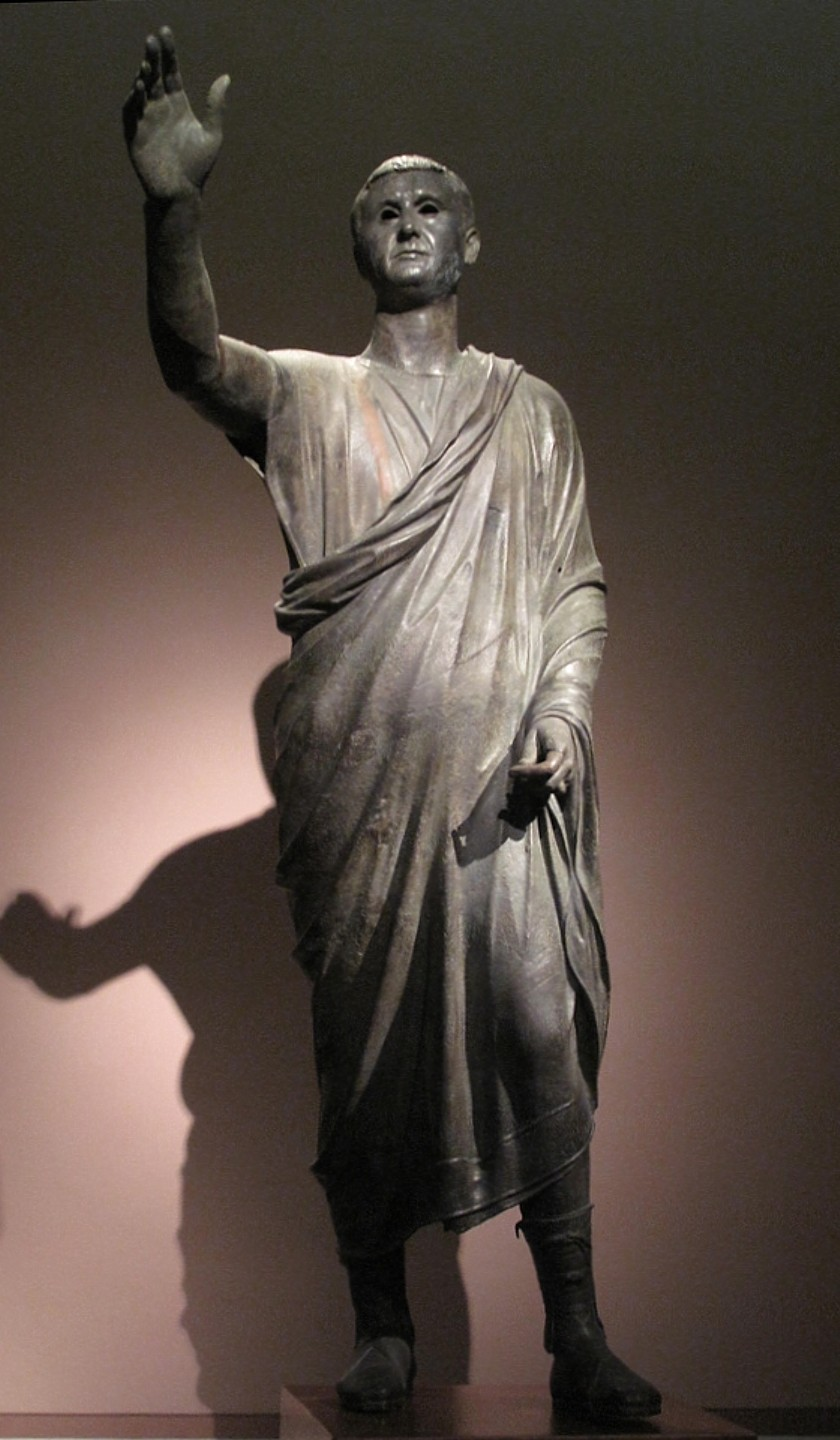
- Year: 110–90 BCE
- Medium: Bronze sculpture
- Dimensions: 179 cm (70 in)
- Location: National Archaeological Museum; Florence

The Orator, also known as L'Arringatore (Italian), Aule Meteli (Etruscan) or Aulus Metellus (Latin), is an Etruscan bronze sculpture from the late second or the early first century BC. Aulus Metellus was an Etruscan senator in the Roman republic, originally from Perugia or Cortona. The Aulus Metellus sculpture was found in 1566. The exact location is debated, but all sources agree the sculpture was found either in or around Lake Trasimeno in the province of Perugia on the border between Umbria and Tuscany, 177 kilometers (110 miles) from Rome. The statue is exhibited in the National Archaeological Museum of Florence.

== Description ==
The statue is 179 cm in height and wears a toga exigua, consisting of a short sleeved tunic underneath a close fitting toga, slung over the left arm and shoulder while leaving the right arm free for movement. The hem starts over the right ankle and heads diagonally upwards to above the left calf. The statue also wears a pair of boots called calceus senatorius, a type of footwear worn by senators and high ranking magistrates made of red leather. The statue stands in a contrapposto pose with one leg supporting the bulk of its weight. The hair of the statue is cut short and combed to the left. The left arm rests at its side with the hand raised and opened slightly, while the right arm is stretched out, bent at the elbow, its palm open and the fingers spread out. The statue wears a ring on its left ringfinger, which is believed to be a scarab ring. Since the statue was made out of seven parts, you can see the seams, where they were attached to each other.

== Inscription ==
On the Aulus Metellus statue there is an inscription written in the Etruscan language. The inscription reads "auleśi meteliś ve[luś] vesial clenśi / cen flereś tece sanśl tenine / tu θineś χisvlicś" ('To (or from) Auli Meteli, the son of Vel and Vesi, Tenine (?) set up this statue as a votive offering to Sans, by deliberation of the people').

== Purpose ==
The Aulus Metellus statue was made for the purpose of a votive offering. A votive offering is an object given to any god of a panhellenic religion as payment for the successful fulfillment of a prayer. This object could be anything from a handmade effigy or, if the giver of the offering is wealthy, a commissioned statue. This idea of the statue being a votive offering is debated, and some historians say the statue was an honorary statue intended for public viewing rather than an offering to the gods. Honorary statues weren't just for decoration of a public place, but they had political and social function.

There is some debate about the family that originally owned the statue and their socioeconomic status. Spivey and other sources state that the Aulus Metellus statue belonged to a wealthy family due to the statue being made out of expensive materials (i.e. bronze) and the level of craftsmanship present in the statue. Shiell states the Aulus Metellus statue belonged to a more average Roman family.

== See also ==
- Capitoline Brutus
- Etruscan art
- Etruscan language
- Etruscan civilization
- Bronze

== Gallery ==
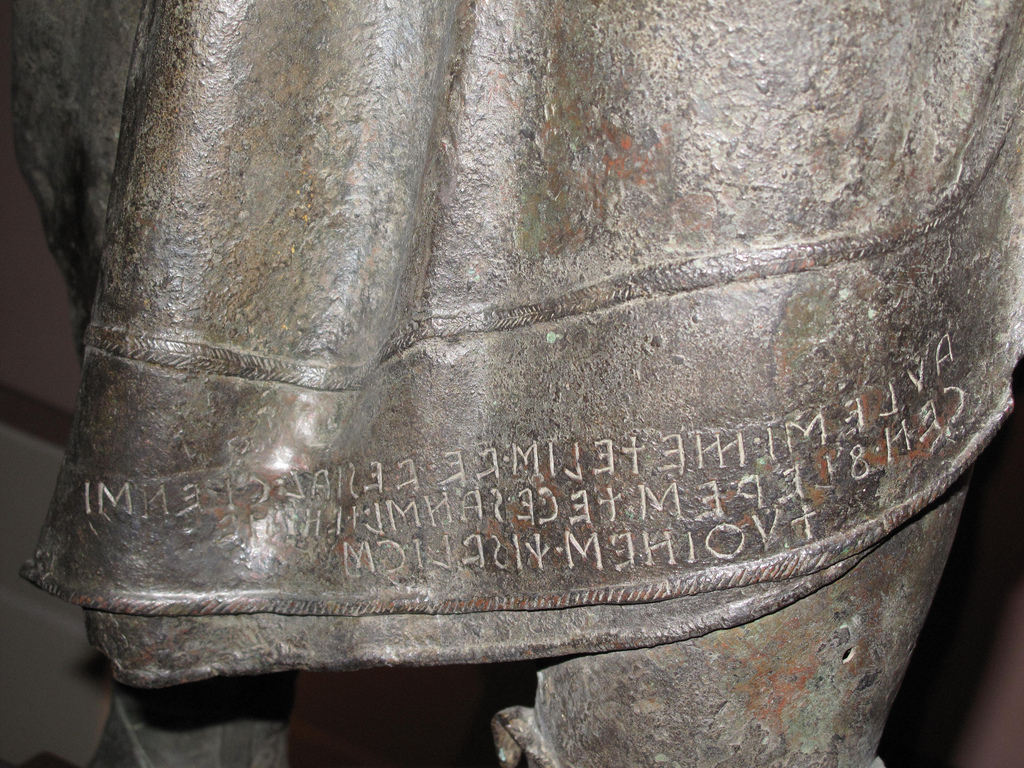
Detail of inscription

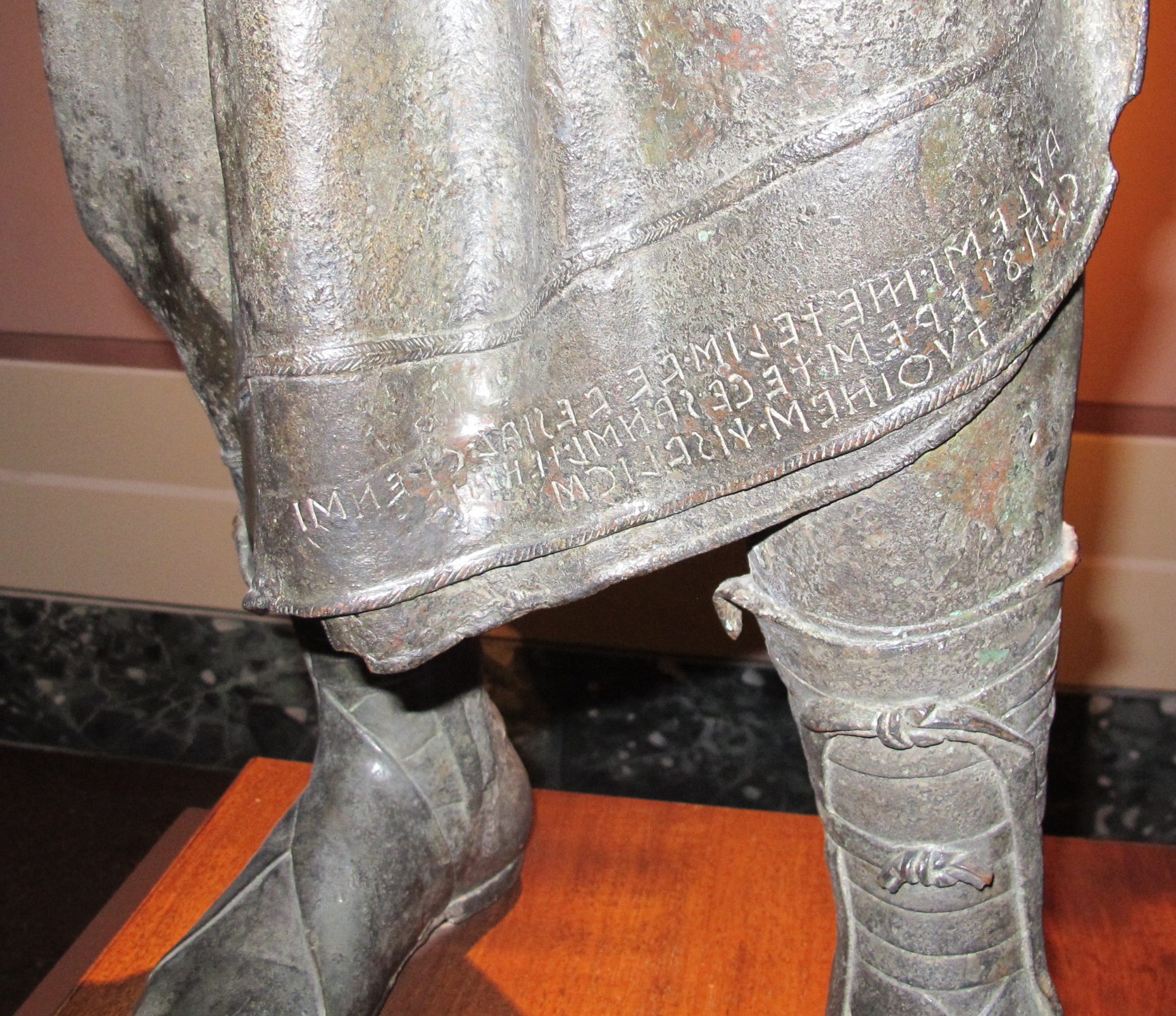
Detail of inscription

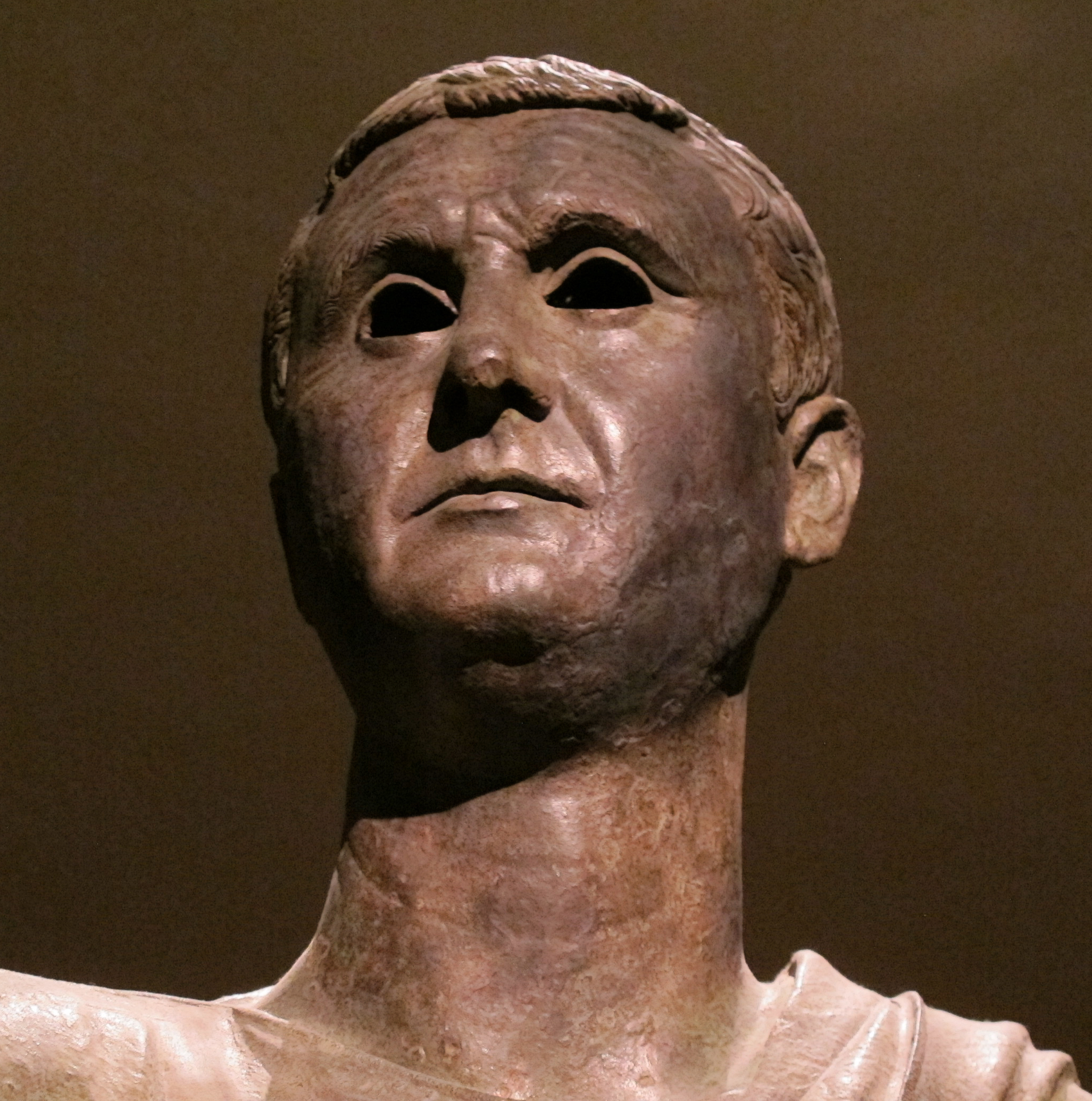
Detail of head

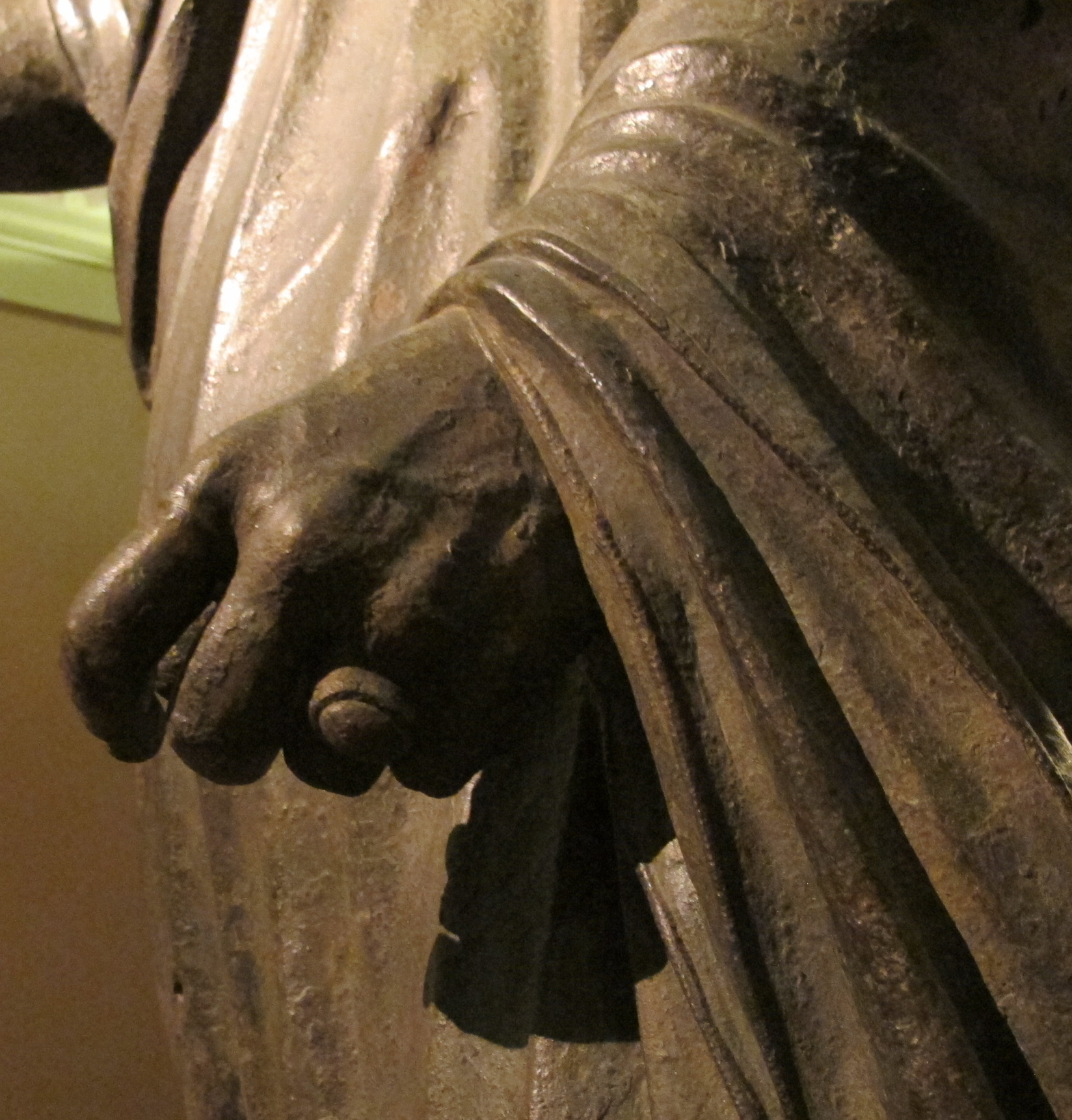
Detail of left hand
