= Hermodorus of Salamis =

Cypriot architect

Hermodorus of Salamis was an ancient Greek architect from Salamis, Cyprus who was highly active in ancient Rome between 146 BC and 102 BC, where his work includes the Temple of Jupiter Stator (2nd century BC) and the Temple of Mars. He also inspired Vitruvius and led the construction of the Navalia.

== General references ==
- Gros, Pierre (1973). "Hermodoros et Vitruve". Mélanges de l'École française de Rome (in French). 85 (1): 137–161. doi:10.3406/mefr.1973.944.
- (in French) Albert Grenier, Le Génie romain dans la religion, la pensée, l'art, Albin Michel, 1969
- (in French) Jean-Marie Pailler, Les mots de la Rome antique, Presses Universitaires du Mirail, 2001
- (in Italian) Frank Van Wonterghem, Topografia romana : Ricerche e discussioni, Firenze, Leo S. Olschki, 1988
