= Esquiline Necropolis =

Cemetery in ancient Rome

Coordinates: 41.8957°N 12.5022°E

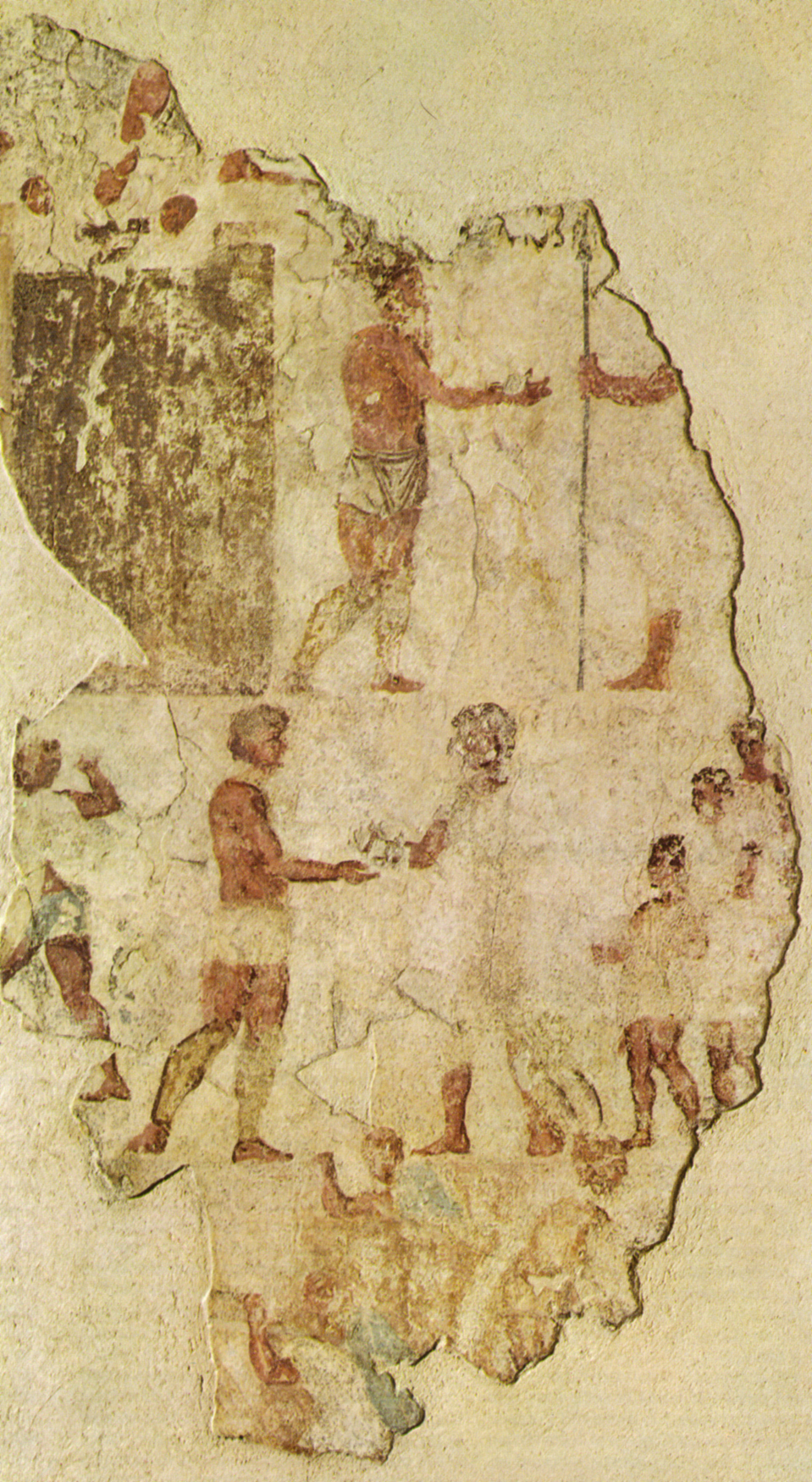
Fresco with a historical scene, the first such in ancient Roman frescoes.

The Esquiline Necropolis (Italian – Necropoli dell'Esquilino) was a prehistoric necropolis on the Esquiline Hill in Rome, in use until the end of the 1st century AD.

It came into use when the Forum necropolis fell into disuse in the mid-8th century BC (other than for child burials, which continued there until the end of the 7th century BC), and testifies to Rome's expansion towards the Velian Hill. Its burials have richer grave goods and are better supplied with weapons, typical of a new aristocratic warrior-class, as already existed in other areas along the Tyrrhenian seaboard such as Etruria and Campania.

As regards the protohistoric period, the burials are of the advanced "second phase" and, more typically, the "third phase", characterized by more compressed-form (rather than globular-form) pots, with more elongated handles towards the top and more "costolature" than moulded or carved decoration.

== Bibliography ==
- Ranuccio Bianchi Bandinelli e Mario Torelli, L'arte dell'antichità classica, Etruria-Roma, Utet, Torino 1976.
- Eugenio La Rocca, “Fabio o Fannio. L'affresco medio-repubblicano dell'Esquilino come riflesso dell'arte rappresentativa e come espressione di mobilità sociale.” Dialoghi di archeologia, ts2.1984 31-53
