= Argelius =

Ancient Greek or Roman architect

Argelius was an ancient writer who wrote a work on the Ionic temple of Aesculapius in Tralles (modern Aydın), of which he was said to have been the architect. He also wrote on the proportions of the Corinthian order. His time is unknown, but as he is mentioned by the writer Vitruvius, we know he lived in or before the 1st century BCE.
