= Pizza dolce di Beridde =

Italian unleavened sweet bread

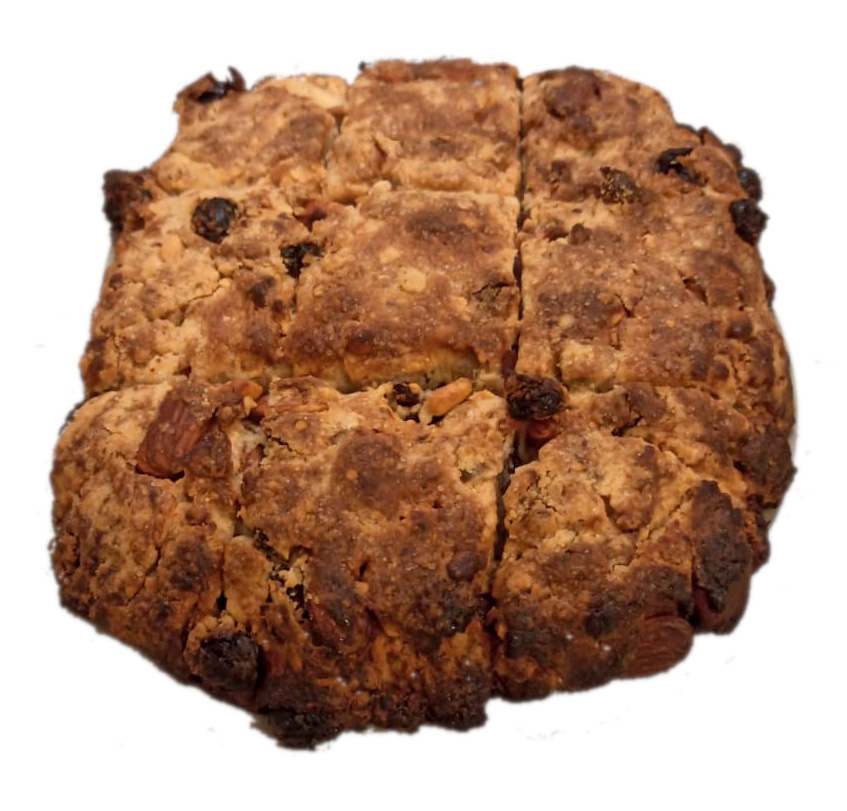
- Alternative names: Pizza ebraica, diamanti romani
- Type: Sweet bread
- Place of origin: Italy
- Region or state: Rome
- Main ingredients: Flour, sugar, almonds, candied fruits, raisins, pine nuts, olive oil, white wine

Pizza dolce di Beridde (lit. 'sweet pizza of Beridde'), also known as pizza ebraica (lit. 'Hebrew pizza') or diamanti romani (lit. 'Roman diamonds'), is an unleavened sweet bread associated with the city of Rome, in the Lazio region of Italy. The Roman Jewish community prepares this traditional dessert on the occasion of a brit milah (ceremony of circumcision).

== Etymology ==
The name pizza is here to be understood not in the recent meaning that has spread into Italian through the Neapolitan language, but in the original Medieval Latin meaning of 'focaccia', and thus suggests, as in the case of the Easter pizza, an ancient origin of the dish. The term pizza in Medieval Latin is first attested in 966 in Naples and in 997 in Gaeta, and was also used to designate ceremonial foods cooked for Easter such as Easter pizzas. Similar preparations (pizza alla rustica, pizza di ricotta) are reported in early 19th century cookery manuals such as Vincenzo Agnoletti's.

The cake's appellation Beridde derives from the Judeo-Roman form of the word Brit milah ('covenant of circumcision' in Hebrew), i.e. the ritual circumcision of male infants in the community.

== History ==
The origins of the dish are obscure, but the cake may have been brought to Rome by Spanish Jews who were driven out of Spain in 1492 or by those expelled from Sicily in 1493. This would explain that the ingredients include nuts, sultanas and candied fruit, typical of the cuisine in Muslim countries.

The pizza ebraica was reportedly Pope Benedict XVI's favorite dessert.

== Ingredients ==
The main ingredients of the bread, which contains neither eggs nor yeast, are flour, sugar, almonds (both whole and ground), raisins, candied fruit (usually candied citron), olive oil or other vegetable oil, white wine and pine nuts.

== Preparation ==
The ingredients are mixed with wine and lukewarm oil, kneading them to form a type of soft, sweet pastry dough that must not stick to the hands. This is rolled out with a rolling pin to a thickness of about 2 cm (0.79 in), cut into lozenges or rectangles (the former are called diamanti), and baked in a very hot oven until a crust forms on the surface, while the inside must remain soft.

== Religious tradition and sale ==
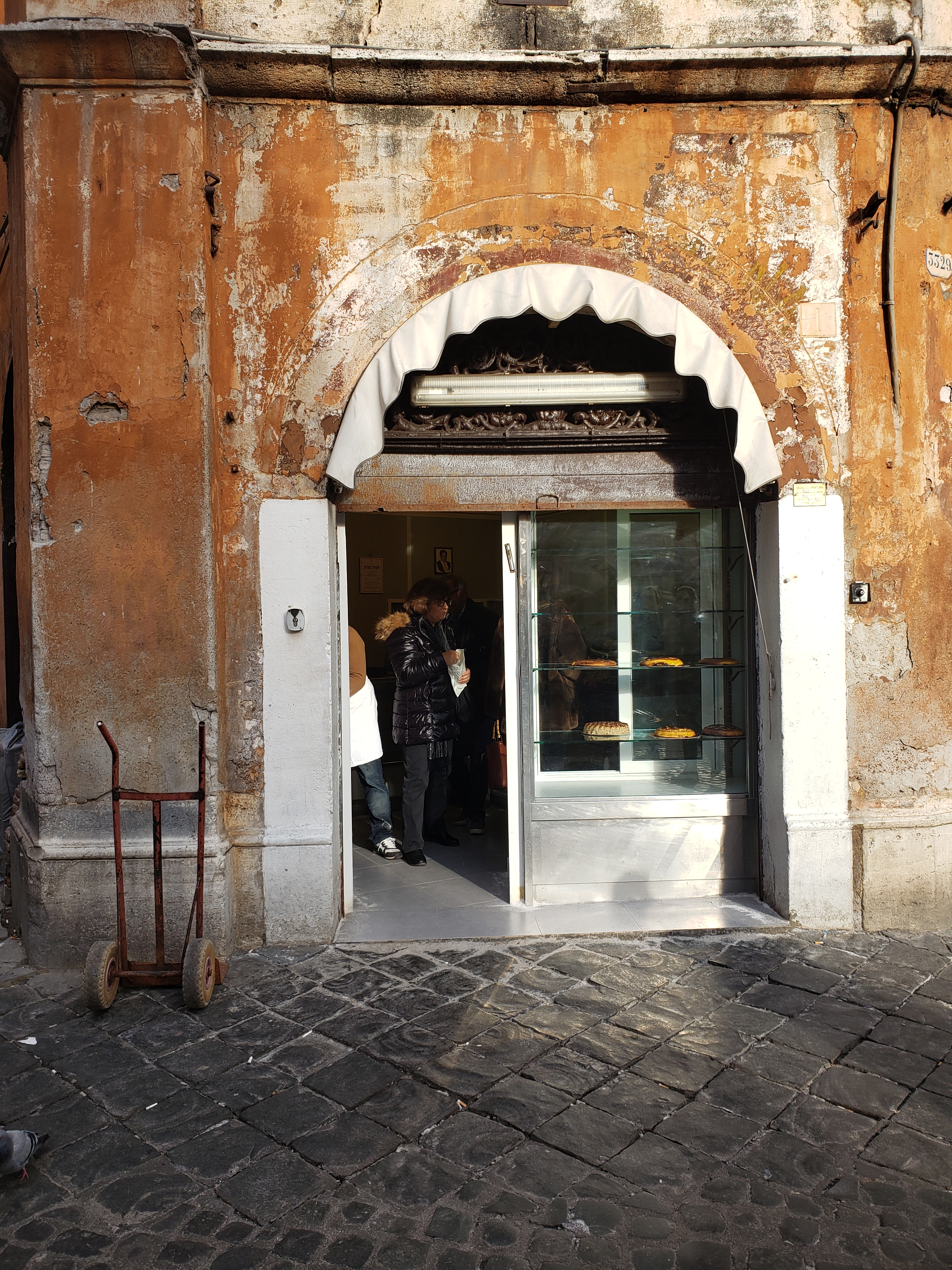
Bakery in Via del Portico di Ottavia in the Roman Ghetto

A lozenge of the cake is traditionally given to each participant of the circumcision feast at the end of the ceremony. It is contained in a bag of sweets called kavodde, which means 'dignity' in Hebrew and symbolises the commandment to honour one's father and mother.

In addition to being prepared in families for the feast of circumcision, pizza di Beridde is sold by kosher bakeries, such as the Pasticceria Boccione in the Roman Ghetto (in Sant'Angelo rione), along with other traditional Jewish sweets, such as ricotta and sour cherry tart and mostaccioli.

== See also ==
Media related to Pizza dolce di Beridde at Wikimedia Commons

- List of Italian desserts and pastries
- List of sweet breads

== Sources ==
- Emilio Faccioli (1987). L'Arte della cucina in Italia (in Italian). Milano: Einaudi. ISBN 88-06-59880-5.
- Benedetta Jasmine Guetta (2022). Cooking alla Giudia: A Celebration of the Jewish Food of Italy. Artisan. ISBN 9781579659806.
- Giuliano Malizia (1995). La Cucina Ebraico-Romanesca (in Italian). Roma: Newton Compton Editori.
