= Muzio Mattei =

Italian nobleman

Muzio Mattei (died 1596) was an Italian nobleman of the House of Mattei. He helped the Mattei rise to prominence by supporting political and cultural initiatives of the Pope and the Church in Rome.

== Political activity ==
Mattei and his family were Roman Catholic but lived in the part of Rome which became the Roman Ghetto; the portion of the city which housed the Roman Jewish population. When Pope Paul IV decided to build a wall around the Ghetto in 1555 and imprison the Jewish population, Mattei was given a key to the gate.

== Fontana delle Tartarughe ==
Between 1580 and 1585, Mattei commissioned one of the most famous fountains in Rome; the Fontana delle Tartarughe (Turtle Fountain) in front of his residence. In an original plan of 1570 a new fountain was to have been placed near the Theater of Marcellus in the Piazza Giudea, the site of a market in the Jewish ghetto. Mattei had been appointed to the committee which would select the site, though, and used his influence and money to have the fountain location changed to the small Piazza Mattei, in the block where the members of his family lived. Mattei also offered to pay to have the piazza properly paved to ensure the sculpture would be well protected; "che il signor Mutio Matthei si obblighi a far mattonare" ("...that Mr Muzio Matthei undertakes to make paved").

A popular Roman legend suggests Mattei, ruined by gambling, ordered the fountain to be built overnight in order to impress the wealthy father of a woman he wished to marry. The next morning he opened the window of his palazzo and showed his future father-in-law the fountain. The father, suitably impressed, allowed the marriage to go ahead, and Mattei, to remember the event, had the window overlooking the fountain closed up. A window closed by brick still overlooks the fountain.

== Other projects ==
It seems Mattei played a role as financier or "project manager" for a number of projects commissioned by Pope Sixtus V. Mattei was responsible for carrying out the orders of Sixtus in relation to the construction of the Four Fountains of Rome. On 23 May 1589, Sixtus V issued the following order:

Cavalier Domenico Fontana, you will consign to Muzio Mattei or to such other as he shall instruct five pieces of peperino from those brought from Settizonio, which We give to him for use in his fountains at Strada Felice and Strada Pia

Though his role is unclear, he was also responsible for some portion of the planning or construction supervision for the Palazzo Albani del Drago on the Quirinal Hill.
