= Sant'Angelo (rione of Rome) =

Coordinates: 41°53′36″N 12°28′40″E

- Rione of Rome
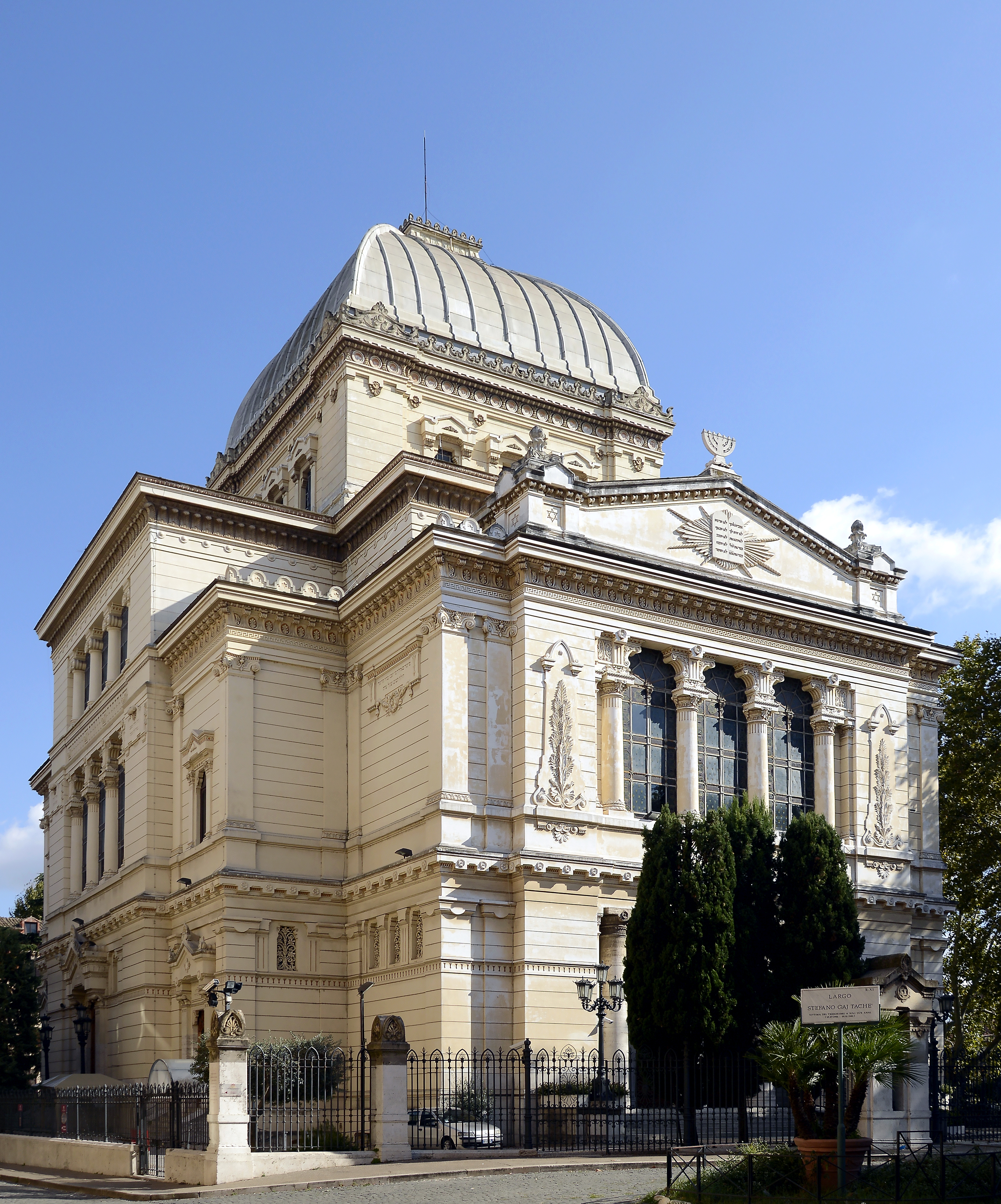
- The Great Synagogue of Rome

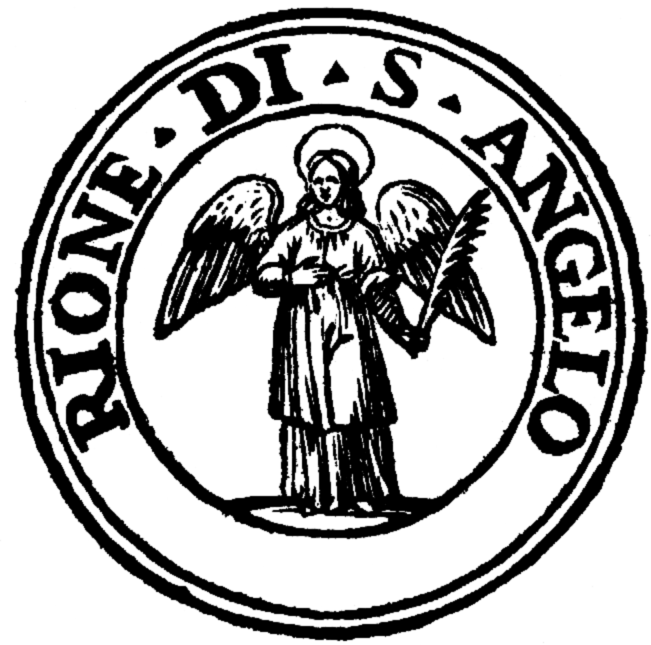
- Seal

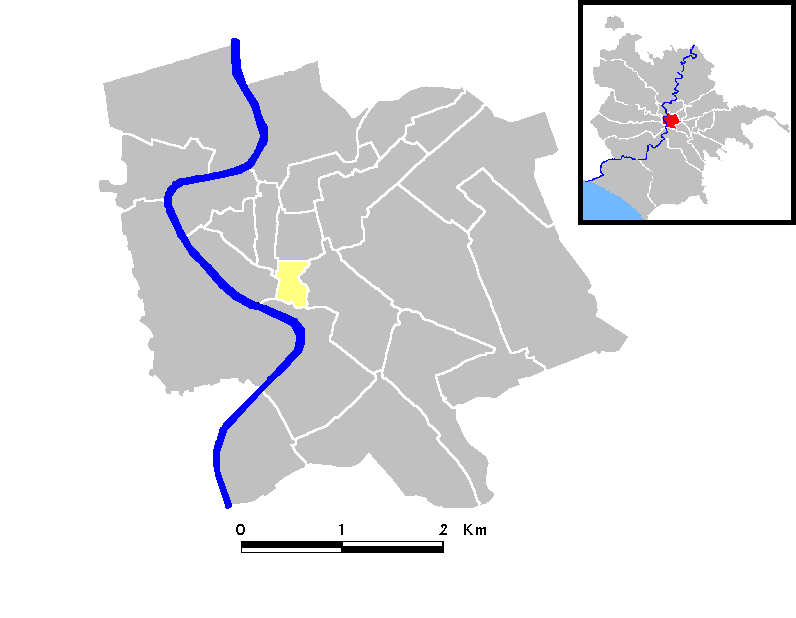
- Position of the rione within the center of the city
- Country: Italy
- Region: Lazio
- Province: Rome
- Comune: Rome
- Time zone: UTC+1 (CET)
  - Summer (DST): UTC+2 (CEST)

Sant'Angelo is the 11th rione of Rome, Italy, located in Municipio I. Often written as rione XI - Sant'Angelo, it has a coat of arms with an angel on a red background, holding a palm branch in its left hand. In another version, the angel holds a sword in its right hand and a scale in its left.

Sant'Angelo, the smallest of Rome's rioni, lies along the Tiber river east of Tiber Island. Rioni bordering this district, clockwise from north to south, include Regola, Sant'Eustachio, Pigna, Campitelli, and Ripa. Sant'Angelo's western border is the river.

The rione's terrain is low and flat and, until the construction of the Lungotevere, particularly susceptible to flooding from the river.

The historical significance of Sant'Angelo is mainly the result of the presence here of the Roman Ghetto.

== History ==
=== Roman Age: Circus Flaminius ===
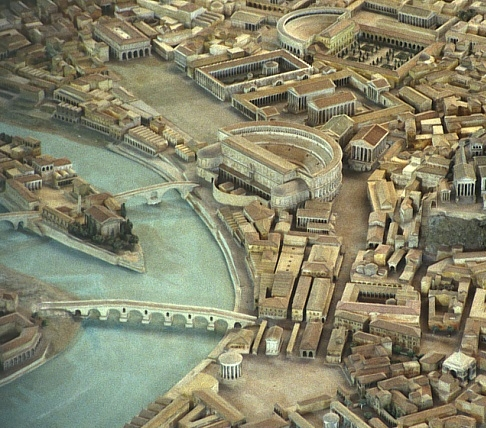
The area of Sant'Angelo in Gismondi's scale model of imperial Rome at the Museum of Roman Civilization. The large central building is the Theater of Marcellus. Further north is the Theater of Balbus. The open area to the upper left is the forum left after the Circus Flaminius was built over. To its northeast are the Porticos of Philippus and Octavia.

During the early Roman period, the territory occupied by Sant'Angelo lay outside the Servian Walls, east of Tiber Island. This location at a point where the river could be forded easily—at least in summer—had great strategic importance. The oldest stone bridge of Rome, the Pons Aemilius, was completed in 142 BC and stood slightly south of the island. The Cestian and Fabrician bridges, built during the 1st century BC to connect the island with the right and the left bank respectively, further increased the importance of the area.

The area housed the Circus Flaminius, which lay near the Capitoline Hill and the Forum and served as the site of the Comitia Plebis as well as the starting point for Roman triumphs. It was also the home of the Forum Olitorium, the Roman vegetable market, as well as porticos built by Gnaeus Octavius in 168 BC and Quintus Caecilius Metellus Macedonicus in 146 BC and temples to Hercules Musarum, Juno Regina, Jupiter Stator, Bellona, Apollo Medicus, Juno Sospita, Hope, and Piety.

In the 1st century BC, Pompey the Great built his grand marble theater and portico nearby. Julius Caesar intended to outdo these but construction was completed much later by Augustus, who dedicated his theater to his nephew Marcellus. It could hold 15,000 spectators at a time. L. Cornelius Balbus built his own smaller theater in the area as well in 13 BC. It featured a cryptoportico, whose remains are still visible beside the Via delle Botteghe Oscure.

During the Empire, the district was part of IX Circus Flaminius, one of fourteen Roman regions. Augustus further beautified the area by destroying both of its previous porticos, replacing them with the Porticus Octaviae dedicated to his sister and the Porticus Philippi constructed by his stepbrother L. Marcius Philippus. In addition to their rehabilitated temples, the Portico of Octavia also included Greek and Latin libraries and 34 bronze statues by Lysippos portraying Alexander the Great and the soldiers who fell during the Battle of the Granicus. Part of the area used for these enlarged plazas was obtained at the expense of the Circus Flaminius.

=== Middle Ages: Sant'Angelo in foro piscium ===
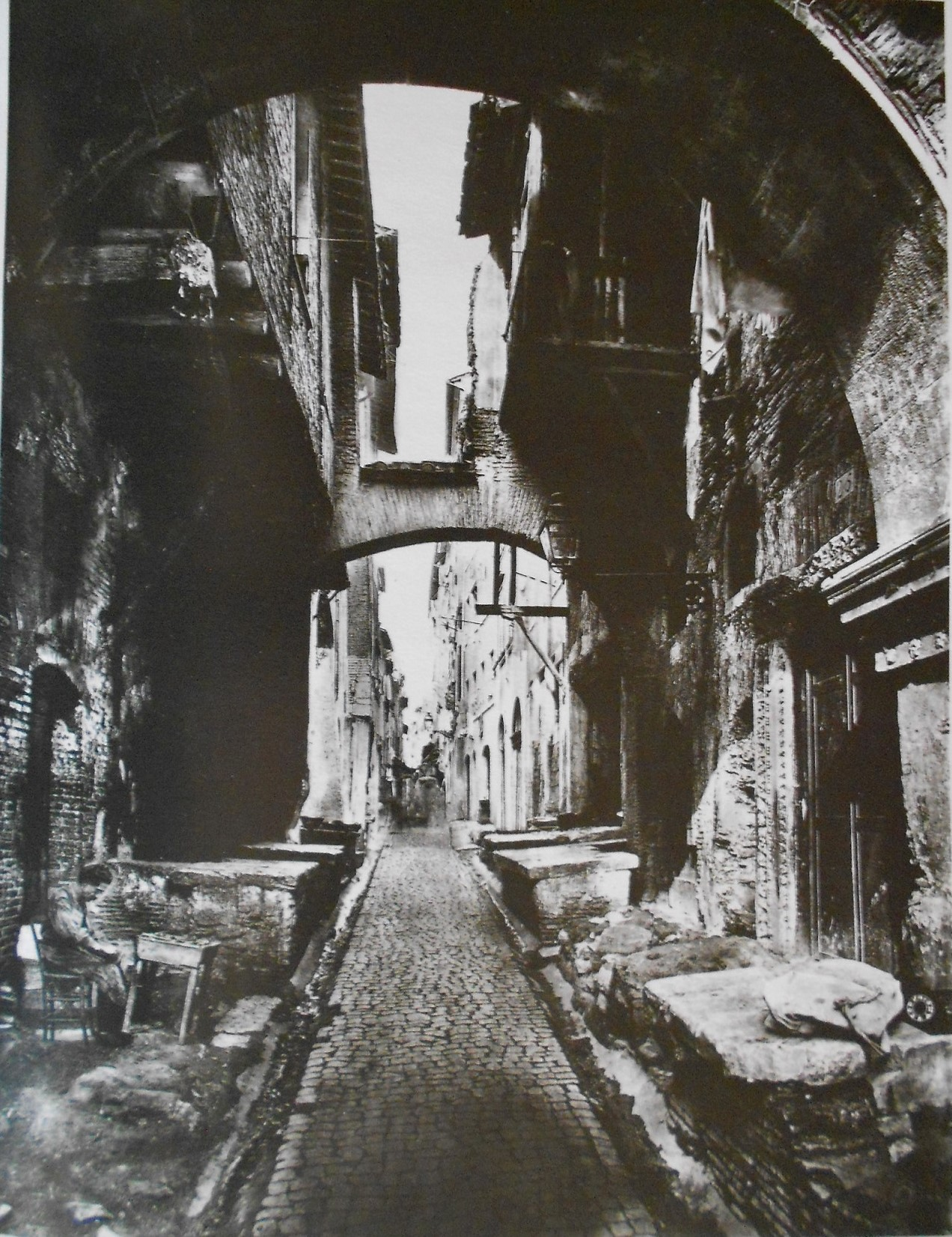
The old fish market ("La Pescheria") in via del Portico d'Ottavia (c. 1860). The marble slabs where the fish was sold are visible on both sides of the road. The houses on the left were demolished together with the Ghetto in 1885, while those on the right are still in place, and host some of the best Jewish restaurants in the Ghetto.

After the end of the Empire the monumental edifices collapsed, but some of them were transformed into fortresses. Several factors played an important role in this transformation: first, the size and solidity of construction; then, the closeness to the Tiber (after the rupture of the aqueducts during the Gothic War, the river became the only source of drinking water for the city). Finally, the possibility of controlling the access to the right bank via the Pons Fabricius, Cestius and Aemilius, the only bridges which were still in place inside the Aurelian Walls by that time.

The baronial families of the Fabii and later of the Savelli, which owned also the stronghold on the Aventine named Corte Savella, nested inside the theatre of Marcellus, while inside the Theater and the Crypta of Balbus the Stefaneschi built the stronghold known as Castrum aureum ("golden castle"), which later was donated to the monastery of Santa Caterina.

The fish market moved from the Forum Piscarium, located near the Forum Romanum, into the ruins of the Porticus Octaviae, which kept this function up to the end of the 19th century, becoming one of the most picturesque places in Rome.

During the Middle Ages the district got the name of Vinea Thedemari, while its northern part was named Calcaràrio, after the limekilns ("Calcàre"), which throughout centuries produced quicklime obtained by burning the marbles of the Roman Fora.

Later appeared also the appellation Sant'Angelo, after the most important church of the rione, Sant'Angelo in Foro Piscium ("St. Angel in the Fish Market"). This church, erected in 770 AD inside the Propylea of the Portico of Octavia, had a great historical importance during the Middle Ages. From here, on the Whitsunday of 1347, the Romans, led by Cola di Rienzo, launched the assault on the Capitol, attempting to restore the Roman Republic.

Being a quarter inhabited mainly by people belonging to the working-class, Sant'Angelo, like the neighboring districts of Regola and Ripa, hosted many guilds: near the church of Santa Caterina were active the rope makers, who twisted their ropes in the 60 m long porticoed yard of the Crypta Balbi. Along the Botteghe Oscure ("Dark shops")—as the arcades of the Theater of Balbus were called— was produced quicklime, while smiths and coppersmiths had their shops inside the arcades of the theater of Marcellus. Finally, carders and shearers worked near the church of San Valentino, while fish mongers were placed under the Portico d'Ottavia, where they sold the fishes on marble slabs which were expensively rented by the noble Roman families. On the wall near the Portico is still visible a copy of the marble plaque (the original can be seen in the Musei Capitolini), whose length gives the maximum size of the fishes which could be sold whole. Those which were longer would have their heads cut off. These had to be given as a perquisite to the Conservatori (the town councillors of papal Rome), who used them to prepare a fish soup. The most typical activity in the market was the fish auction, known as cottío, which took place every night after 2 a.m. Particularly popular in Rome was the cottío on December 23. Many Romans attended it to buy the fish needed for the dinner of Christmas Eve, and many more just to watch the show. It marked the beginning of the Christmas holidays.

=== Renaissance: Serraglio delli Ebrei ===
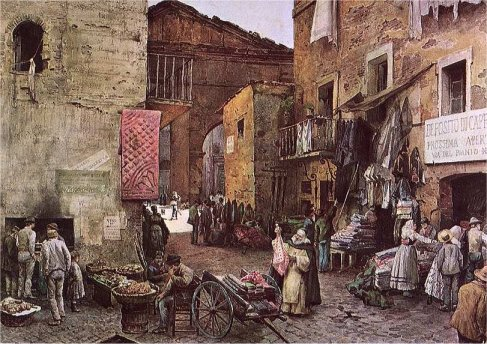
Disappeared Ghetto: via Rua in a watercolour by Ettore Roesler Franz (c. 1880). Via Rua (Rua is a word analogue to the French rue) was the main road in the old Ghetto. There were active many shops of second-hand clothes.

The Renaissance reached Sant'Angelo around the middle of the 15th century. At that time Lorenzo Manili, a noble Roman antiquarian enthusiastic about his city, built his house with a façade containing Roman bas-reliefs and a long inscription in Latin, where he praises the rebirth of the Eternal City.

In the 16th century, the Savelli had built on the top of the Theatre of Marcellus a beautiful palace, the work of Baldassarre Peruzzi, later owned by the Orsini. In the meantime, in the north side of the rione, another powerful family, the Mattei, erected four palaces, which together formed a whole block, named "Isola dei Mattei" ("Mattei's block"). Other noble families too, like the Costaguti, Santacroce and Serlupi, chose to build their residences here in that period.

But, while the wind of the Renaissance was starting to blow around Rome, another event changed deeply the destiny of the rione: the arrival of the Jews. A Jewish colony was present in Rome since the beginning of the Christian era, but the Jews by then had been living in Transtiberim, near the Port of Ripa Grande.

Because of the decay of the river trade, at the beginning of the 15th century they left the right bank and scattered through the city. By that time, in Rome there were about 2,000 Jews: 1,200 were living in Sant'Angelo (where they totaled 80 per cent of the population), 350 in Regola, 200 in Ripa, while the others were distributed among the remaining districts.

On 14 July 1555, Pope Paul IV, one of the champions of the Counter-Reformation, promulgated the Bull "Cum nimis absurdum", where he revoked all the rights of the Jewish community and enclosed them in a walled district, the Ghetto. The Christians who were owners of the houses placed inside the Ghetto could keep the property but, thanks to the so-called "jus gazzagà" (right of possession) they could neither evict the Jews nor raise the rents.

The wall was interrupted by two gates, which were opened at dawn and closed every night, one hour after sunset between November and Easter, and two hours otherwise. The area had a trapezoidal shape, and contained hardly any noteworthy buildings. The only important square – Piazza Giudea – was divided in two parts by the wall. All the churches which stood in the Ghetto were deconsecrated and demolished soon after its construction.

The Roman Jews were allowed to practice only unskilled jobs, as ragmen, secondhand dealers or fishmongers. They could also be pawnbrokers, and this activity excited the hate of the Christians against them.

In the lottery game, they were allowed to bet only on low numbers (from 1 through 30), and all belonging to the same group of 10. In case of a draw of five numbers of that kind, the Romans said that on that day in the Ghetto there was taking place a great feast.

When they went outside their district, the men had to wear a yellow cloth (the "sciamanno"), and the women a yellow veil (the same color worn by prostitutes). During the feasts they had to amuse the Christians, competing in humiliating games. They had to run naked, with a rope around the neck, or with their legs closed into sacks. Sometimes they were also ridden by soldiers.

Each year, on the Campidoglio, the rabbi had to pay homage to the chief of the city councillors ("Caporione"), receiving by him in exchange for it a kick to his bottom. This "ceremony" meant that the Jewish community had been allowed to stay one more year in Rome.

Every Saturday, the Jewish community was forced to hear compulsory sermons in front of the small church of San Gregorio a Ponte Quattro Capi, just outside the wall.

At the time of its construction, in the Ghetto – as almost everywhere in Rome – there was no fresh water. However, some years later the Popes built several fountains in the rione, and one was placed in Piazza Giudea.

The great number of people living in such a small area, together with the poverty of the population, caused terrible hygienic conditions. The district, lying very low and near the Tiber, was often flooded. 800 of 4,000 inhabitants in the plague of 1656. Sant'Angelo, which was the rione with the smallest area, was also, thanks to the presence of the Ghetto, the one having the largest population density.

=== Modern Age ===
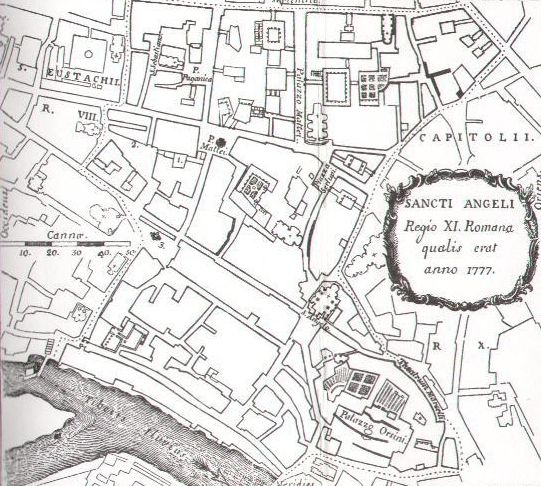
Sant'Angelo in 1777 (Map printed by Monaldini). On the southern part of the map – enclosed by a wall – is visible the Ghetto.

The 17th and the 18th centuries passed without noteworthy events: the center of gravity of the Church had already moved from the Lateran to the Vatican and Borgo, and the Capitol lost its importance as a residential area in favor of the Campo Marzio plain.

Things started to change again with the French Revolution. During the Roman republic, in 1798, the gates of the Ghetto were finally opened, and the Tree of Freedom was planted in Piazza Giudea. The fall of Napoleon caused the compulsory return of the Jews to the walled district.

In 1848, Pius IX ordered the demolition of the walls but, because of the resistance of the Romans, the task had to be accomplished during the night. Anyway, it was only after the unification of Italy on 20 September 1870, that the Roman Jews ceased to be considered as second-class citizens.

After the unification of Italy huge transformations affected the district. Great walls were built along the river, in order to avoid prevent flooding, and this caused the demolition of the picturesque row of houses which were mirrored in the Tiber. The Ghetto, although the Jews were now free citizens, was always crowded with the Jewish community, but the hygienic conditions forced a radical solution. The whole quarter was pulled down in 1885, spending much more than the originally budgeted five millions Lire, and new buildings, whose style does not match with the old buildings, arose around the new Great Synagogue of Rome. The only part of Sant'Angelo which can still give an idea of the old Ghetto is along the lane named Via della Reginella, which was included in the walled district only during the 19th century.

During the 1920s, Sant'Angelo was affected by the great demolition works started in the center of Rome by the Fascist regime. In 1926, the quarter around the Theater of Marcellus was pulled down, while the monument was isolated and restored. Many picturesque medieval structures, lanes and squares disappeared, but this work revealed certain Roman temples: the temples of Apollo Sosianus and of Bellona were unearthed by the archeologists at that time. Moreover, also beautiful medieval houses, including the House of the Vallati and the Albergo della Catena, up to then hidden under later accretions, were carefully restored.

Then, in 1940, in the north side of the rione, the street Via delle Botteghe Oscure was drastically enlarged, and there also churches and palaces fell victim to the pickaxe.

After the demolitions during the Fascist period, it was decided to modify the historical borders of the rione, established in 1743 under Benedict XIV. Sant'Angelo then spread out, incorporating small but important parts of the adjacent districts of Campitelli and Ripa. Among other things, the churches of Santa Maria in Campitelli and of San Gregorio della divina Pietà then became part of the rione.

During the German occupation of Rome in World War II, the Jewish community was forced to pay 50 kg gold to the SS, to avoid deportation to the Nazi concentration camps. On October 16, 1943, despite the payment of the ransom, 2,091 Jews were deported, and most of them were murdered in Auschwitz. Many others were also killed on March 24, 1944, in the Ardeatine massacre.

=== Sant'Angelo today ===
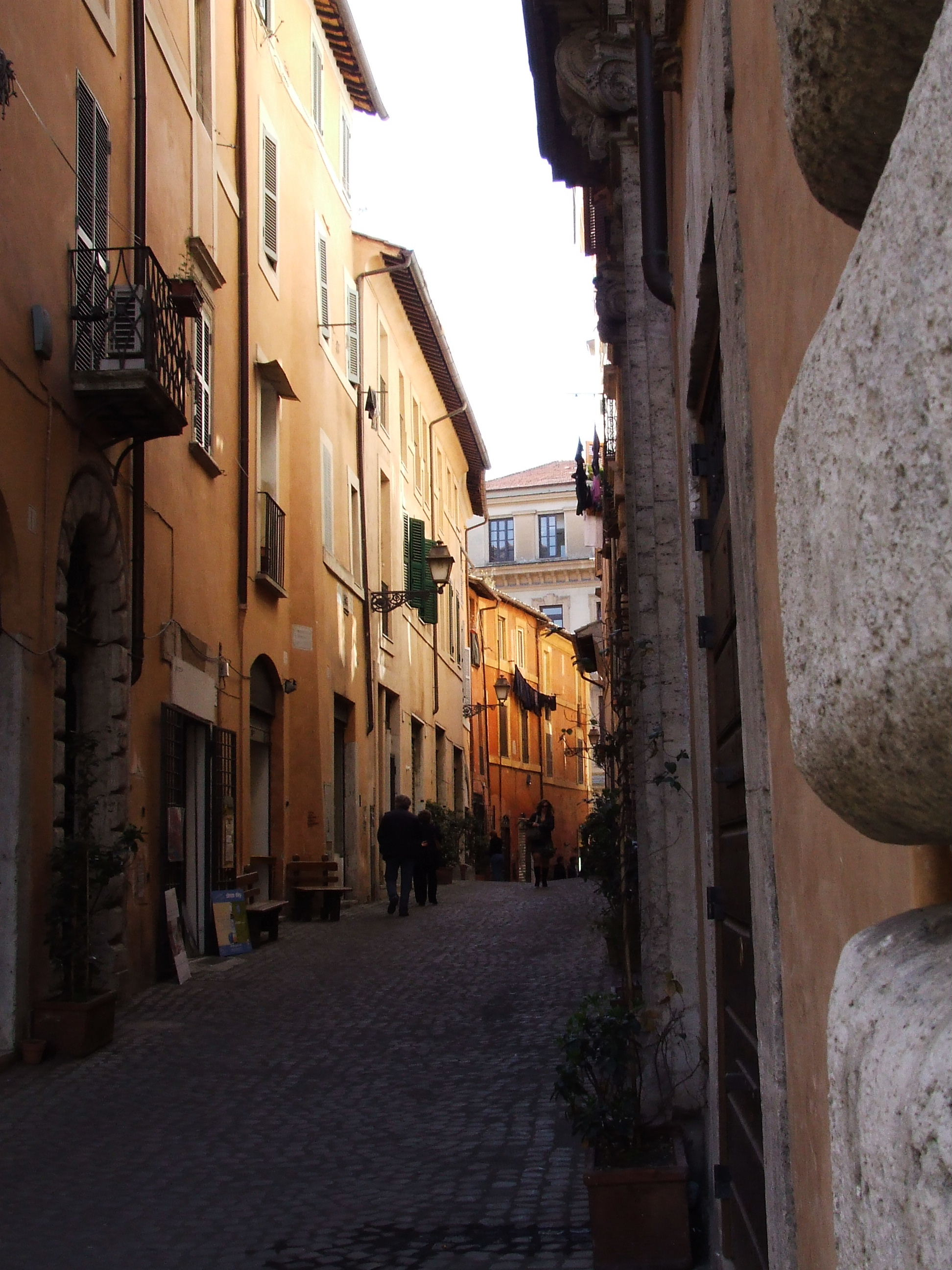
Via dei Falegnami viewed from Piazza Mattei

At the dawn of the 21st century Sant'Angelo remains one of the most characteristic districts in the old Rome. While the northern part of the rione, with its web of narrow, lonely lanes which protect it from the traffic, keeps a mainly residential character, the southern part is always characterized by the strong Jewish presence. The roads around the Portico d'Ottavia keep the atmosphere of a village, and host several small shops (also run by Jews) and many Trattorie, which, with their fried artichokes and filet of stockfish, perpetuate the tradition of the Jewish Roman cooking.

The presence of a strong Jewish community makes necessary a continuous – albeit discreet – presence of Police and Carabinieri, deployed above all near the Synagogue in order to prevent attacks.

Sant'Angelo hosts also several cultural institutions, such as the Enciclopedia Italiana, the Discoteca Nazionale and the Centro di Studi Americani, which holds the most important library of Americana in Europe.

== Geography ==
=== Borders ===
To the north, Sant'Angelo borders with Pigna (R. IX), from which is separated by Via delle Botteghe Oscure and Via Florida.

To the east, the rione borders with Campitelli (R. X), whose border is marked by Via d'Aracoeli, Via Margana, Piazza Margana, Via dei Delfini, Via Cavalletti, Piazza di Campitelli, Via Montanara and Via del Teatro di Marcello.

Southward, it borders with Ripa (R. XII), the boundary being outlined by Via del Foro Olitorio, Lungotevere dei Pierleoni, Ponte Fabricio and the Tiber, beside the Tiber Island.

To the west, the rione borders with Regola, from which is separated by Piazza delle Cinque Scole and Via di Santa Maria del Pianto. It also borders with Sant'Eustachio (R. VIII), whose border is marked by Via in Publicolis, Via dei Falegnami, Via di Sant'Elena and Largo Arenula.

== Noteworthy things in the Rione ==
=== Squares ===
- Piazza dei Calcarari
- Piazza Campitelli
- Piazza delle Cinque Scole
- Piazza Costaguti
- Piazza dell'Enciclopedia
- Piazza Lovatelli
- Piazza Mattei
- Piazza di Monte Savello
- Piazza Paganica

=== Streets ===
- Via d'Aracoeli
- Via delle Botteghe Oscure
- Via M.Caetani
- Via Catalana
- Lungotevere de' Cenci
- Vicolo Costaguti
- Via dei Delfini
- Via de'Falegnami
- Vicolo de' Falegnami
- Via Florida
- Via del Foro Olitorio
- Via del Foro Piscario
- Via de'Funari
- Via Montanara
- Via di Monte Savello
- Via Paganica
- Vicolo Paganica
- Lungotevere dei Pierleoni
- Via dei Polacchi
- Vicolo dei Polacchi
- Via del Portico d'Ottavia
- Via in Publicolis
- Vicolo in Publicolis
- Via della Reginella
- Via di S.Ambrogio
- Via di S.Angelo in Pescheria
- Via di S.Elena
- Vicolo di S.Elena
- Via di S.Maria del Pianto
- Via del Teatro di Marcello
- Via del Tempio
- Via della Tribuna di Campitelli

=== Buildings ===
- Theatre of Marcellus
- Portico di Ottavia
- Palazzo Mattei di Giove
- Palazzo Mattei di Paganica
- Palazzo di Giacomo Mattei
- Palazzo Costaguti
- Palazzo Caetani
- Palazzo Santacroce
- House of the Vallati
- House of Lorenzo Manili
- Albergo della catena
- Palazzo Orsini Savelli

=== Churches ===
- Santa Caterina dei Funari
- Sant'Angelo in Pescheria
- Oratorio dei pescivendoli
- San Gregorio della divina pietà
- Santo Stanislao dei Polacchi
- Santa Rita da Cascia
- Santa Maria in Campitelli
- San Nicola in Carcere
- Sant'Ambrogio della Massima
- Santi Sebastiano e Valentino (destroyed)

=== Other monuments ===
- Synagogue
- Fountain of the Tortoises
- Fountain of Piazza Giudea

== Bibliography ==
- Baronio, Cesare (1697). Descrizione di Roma moderna (in Italian). M.A. and P.A. De Rossi, Roma.
- About, Edmond (1861). Rome contemporaine (in French). Hetzel, Paris.
- Zanazzo, Giggi (1907–1910). Usi, costumi e pregiudizi del popolo di Roma (in Italian). Torino – Roma.
- Delli, Sergio (1975). Le strade di Roma (in Italian). Newton Compton, Roma.
- Pietrangeli, Carlo (1976). Guide rionali di Roma (in Italian). Vol. Sant'Angelo. Fratelli Palombi, Roma.
- Staccioli, Romolo (1988). Roma entro le mura (in Italian). Fratelli Melita Roma.
