= Santo Stanislao dei Polacchi =

- Basilica of Saint Stanislaus of the Poles
- Basilica di Santo Stanislao dei Polacchi
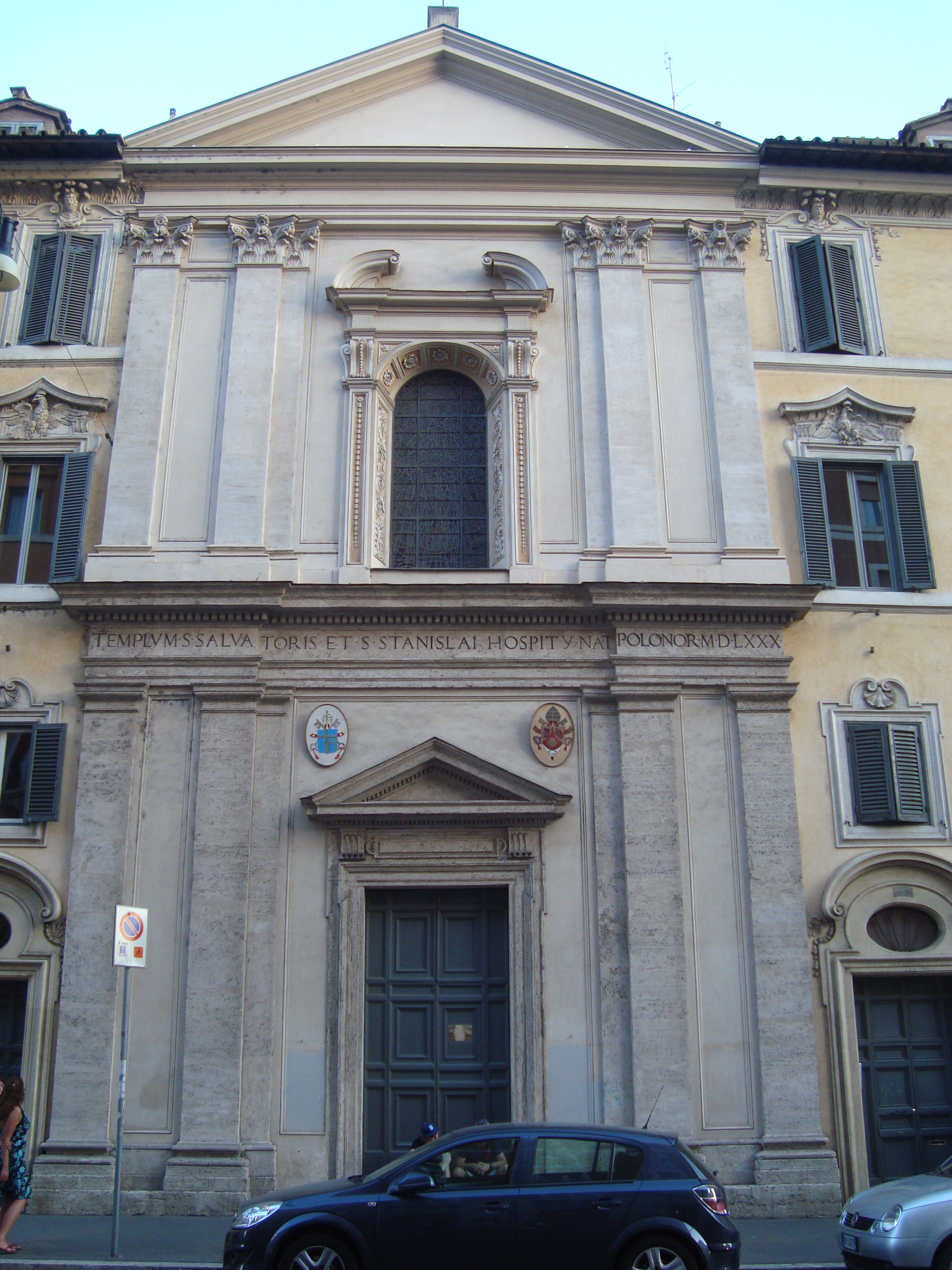
- Click on the map for a fullscreen view
- 41.8948°N 12.4793°E
- Location: 15 Via delle Botteghe Oscure, Sant'Angelo, Rome
- Country: Italy
- Language: Polish
- Denomination: Catholic
- Tradition: Roman Rite
- Website: duszpasterstwopolakowwrzymie.com

History
- Status: national church
- Founded: 1735
- Dedication: Stanislaus of Szczepanów

Architecture
- Architect: Francesco Ferrari
- Architectural type: Baroque
- Completed: 1735

Administration
- Diocese: Rome

Santo Stanislao dei Polacchi (Saint Stanislaus of the Poles, Polish: Kościół św. Stanisława Biskupa i Męczennika w Rzymie), also known as San Stanislao alle Botteghe Oscure, is a Roman Catholic church in Rome, sited on Via delle Botteghe Oscure in the Sant'Angelo rione. It is the national church of Poland in Rome.

== History ==
It is on the site of the medieval church San Salvatore in pensilis de Sorraca, built on the remains of the Circus Flaminius (and recorded in several documents between 1174 and 1209). An inscription now housed in the entrance of the Palazzo Busiri on via Aurora (all that remains of the medieval church) refers to this church's rebuilding being completed on 28 October 1285 "per venerabilem Hieronymum episcopum Prenestinum".

Pope Gregory XIII granted the church to the Polish cardinal Stanislaus Hosius, who completely rebuilt the church in 1580 – it became Poland's national church in Rome, re-dedicated to the country's patron saint, Stanislaus of Kraków. Its present appearance dates to its rebuilding in the 18th century by Ignazio Brocchi, architect to Stanisław August Poniatowski, king of Polish-Lithuanian Commonwealth. Its façade is by Francesco Ferrari and dates to 1735.

== Description ==
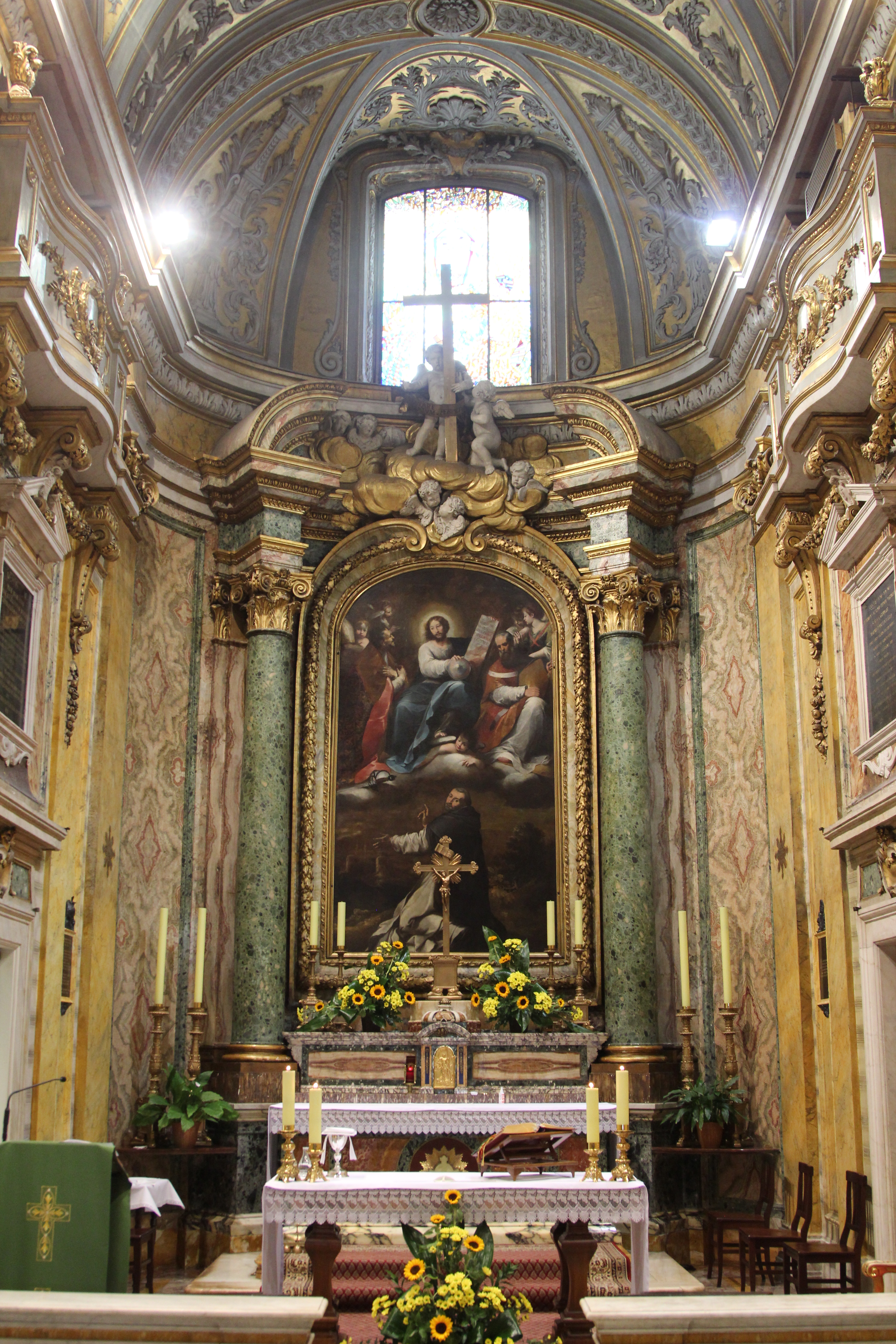
High altar

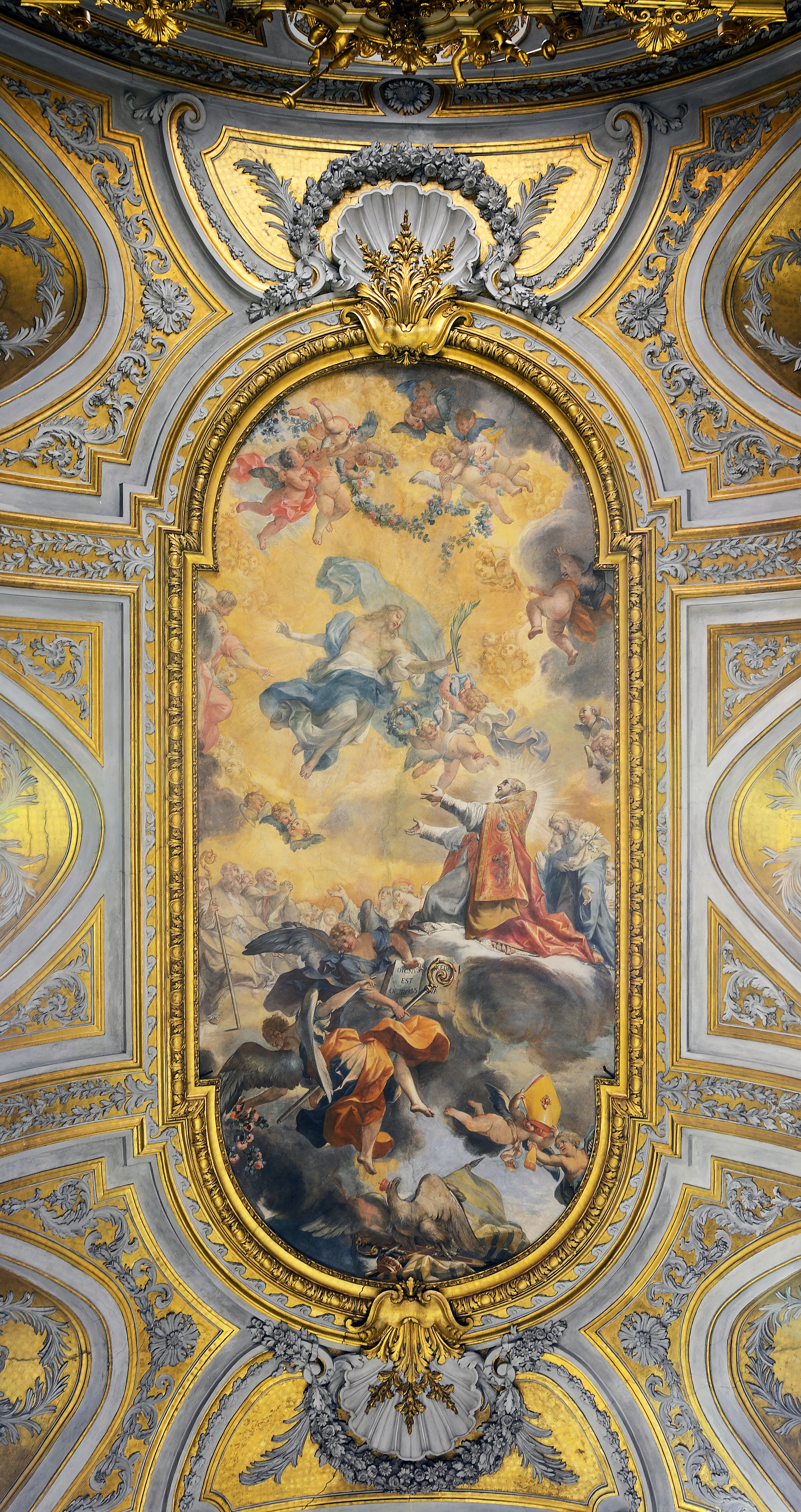
Fresco of the glory of Saint Stanislaus.

Its interior is a single nave, with a ceiling painting by Ermenegildo Costantini of The Glory of Saint Stanislaus. The high altarpiece by Antiveduto Gramatica (late 16th century) shows Jesus and saints Stanislaus and Hyacinth. The church also contains works by Taddeo Kuntze and other Polish artists of the 18th century.

== Bibliography ==
- Mariano Armellini, Le chiese di Roma dal secolo IV al XIX, Roma 1891, p. 569
- Christian Hülsen, Le chiese di Roma nel Medio Evo, Firenze 1927, pp. 449–450
- Filippo Titi, Descrizione delle Pitture, Sculture e Architetture esposte in Roma, Roma 1763, p. 183
- Claudio Rendina, Le Chiese di Roma, Newton & Compton Editori, Roma 2000, p. 350 ISBN 978-88-541-1833-1
- M. Quercioli, Rione XI S. Angelo, in AA.VV, I rioni di Roma, Newton & Compton Editori, Roma 2000, Vol. II, pp. 726–765
