= Taddeo Landini =

Italian sculptor and architect (c. 1561–1596)

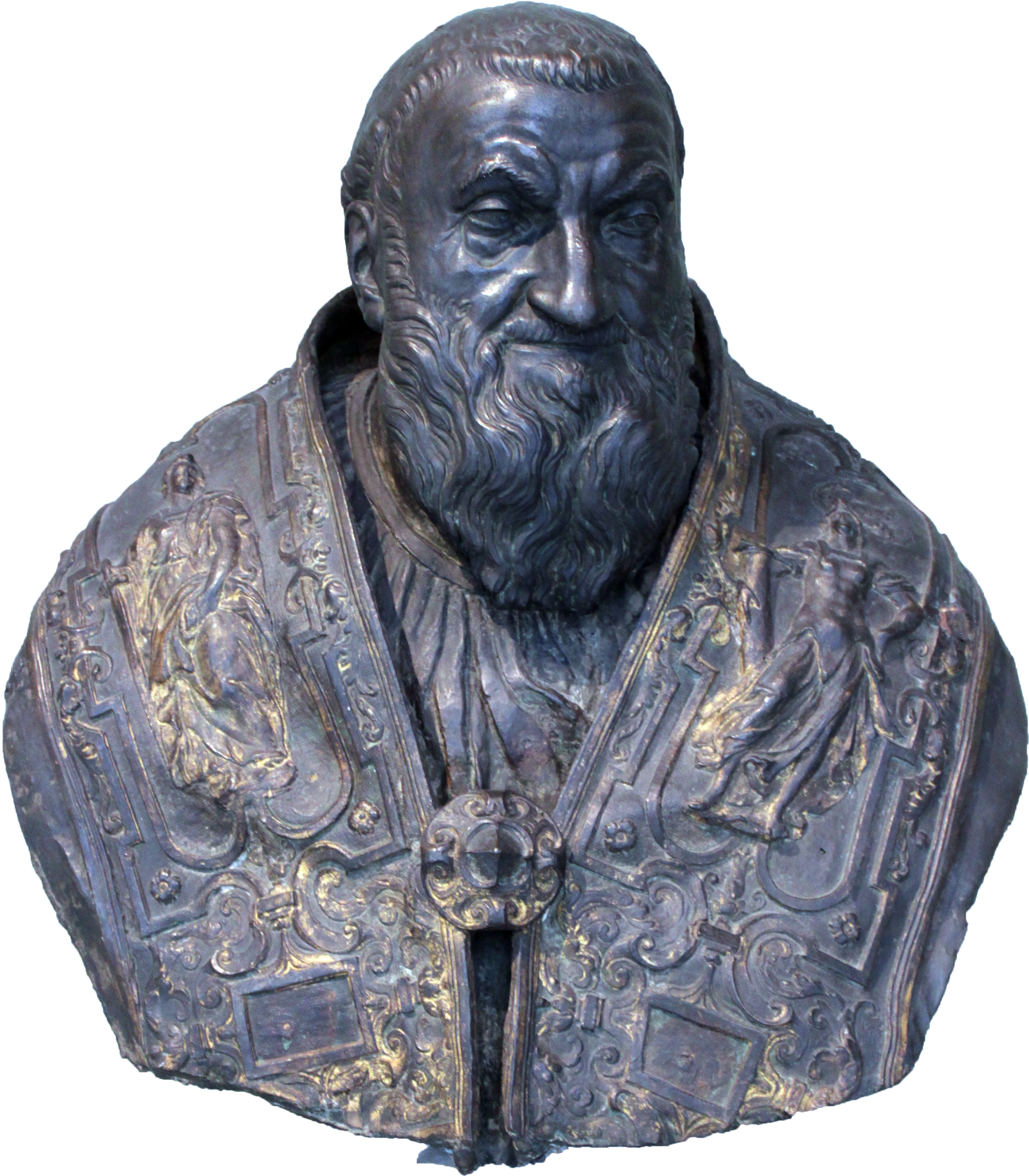
Bust of Pope Sixtus V, 1585–1590

Taddeo Landini (c. 1561 – March 13, 1596) was an Italian sculptor and architect of the Mannerist period, active mainly in his native Florence and after 1580, in Rome.

== Biography ==
His initial training was in Tuscany, and to Rome, he brought the decorative style of Florentine fountains.

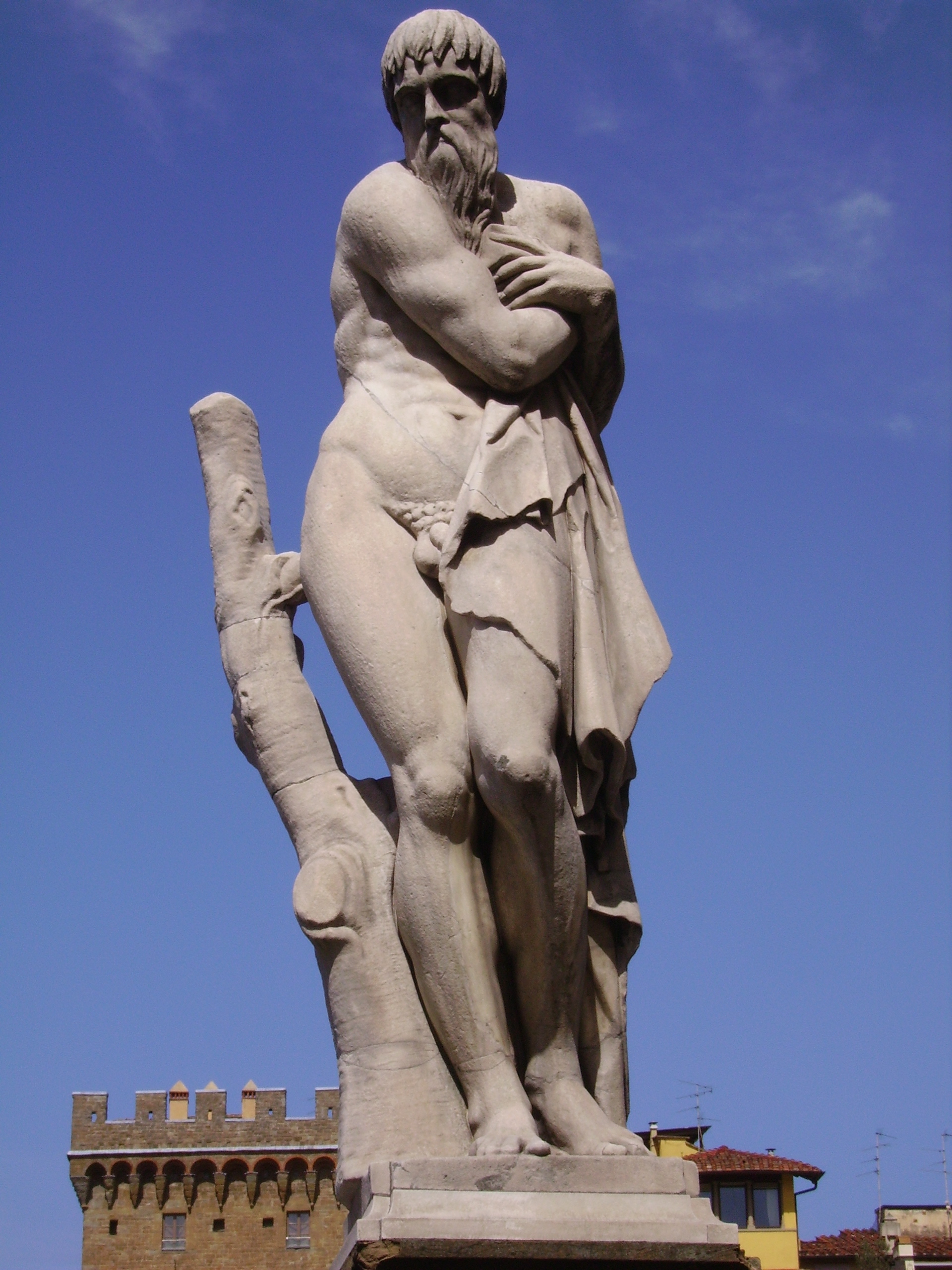
Winter in Ponte Santa Trinita

In Florence, in the early 1580s, he sculpted a copy of Michelangelo's Risen Christ for the church of Santo Spirito. He was also called to sculpt the statue of Winter, a man shivering, on the Ponte Santa Trinita over the river Arno. The bridge was designed by Ammanati. The other three seasons were completed by either Caccini and Francavilla.

Moving to Rome, he completed the relief of Christ washing the Feet of the Disciples and a triton for the fountains in Piazza Navona. He also completed a large, no longer extant, gilt-bronze seated statue of Pope Sixtus V in the Campidoglio. A smaller bust still remains.

His most famous work is that the four bronze mannered adolescents were cast in bronze for a fountain, Fontana delle Tartarughe, in the Piazza Mattei, not far from the church of Santa Caterina dei Funari. This project was likely influenced by figures in Ammanati's Fountain of Neptune in Florence. The design of the water spouts was altered decades later to turtles by Bernini. Landini was appointed architect for Pope Clement VIII. However, on visiting Florence, he was afflicted by syphilis and from thereon did not dare appear before the pontiff.

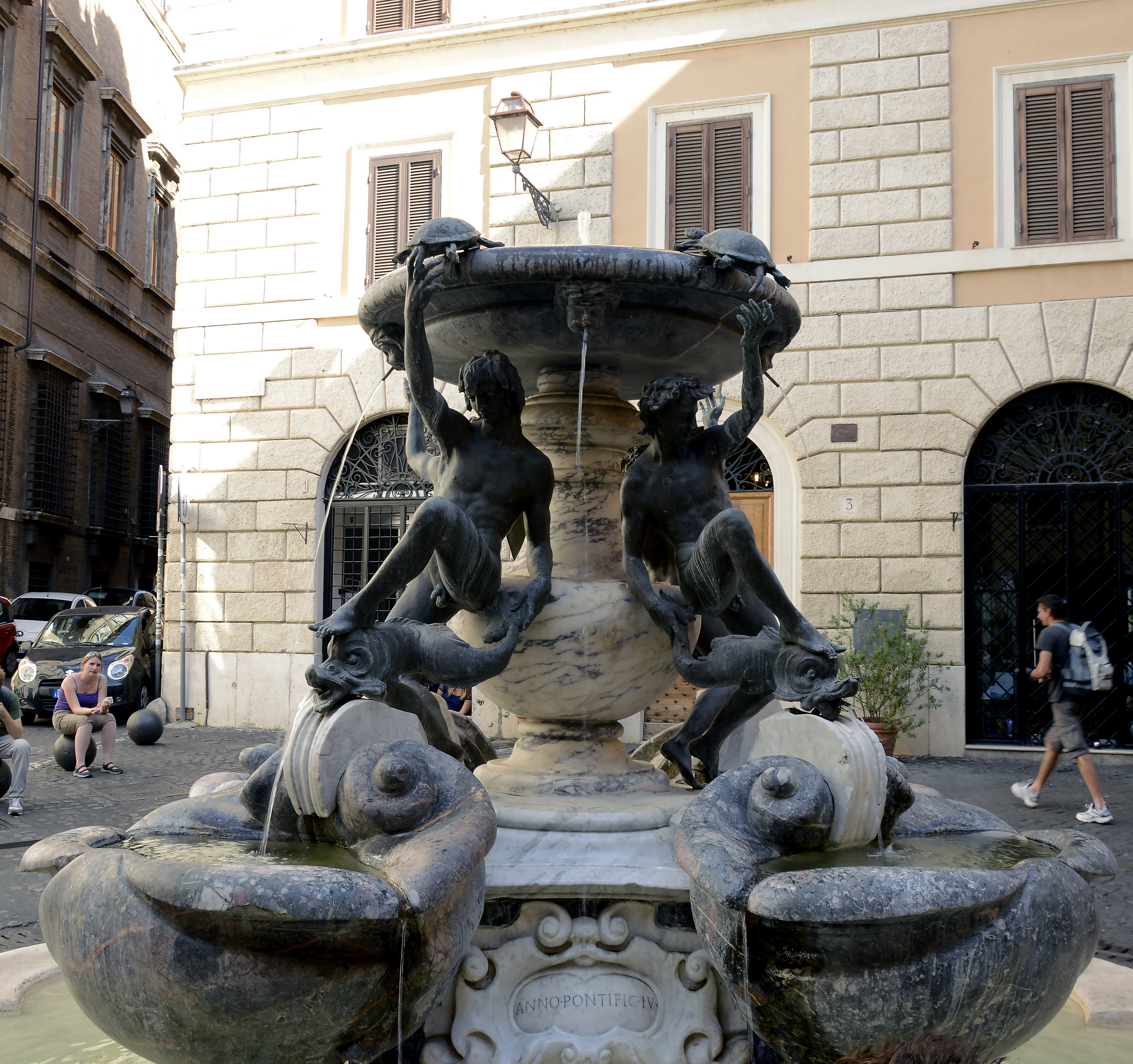
Fontana delle tartarughe, Rome

== Sources ==
- Grove encyclopedia of Art entry
