= Pasticceria Boccione =

Bakery in Rome, Italy

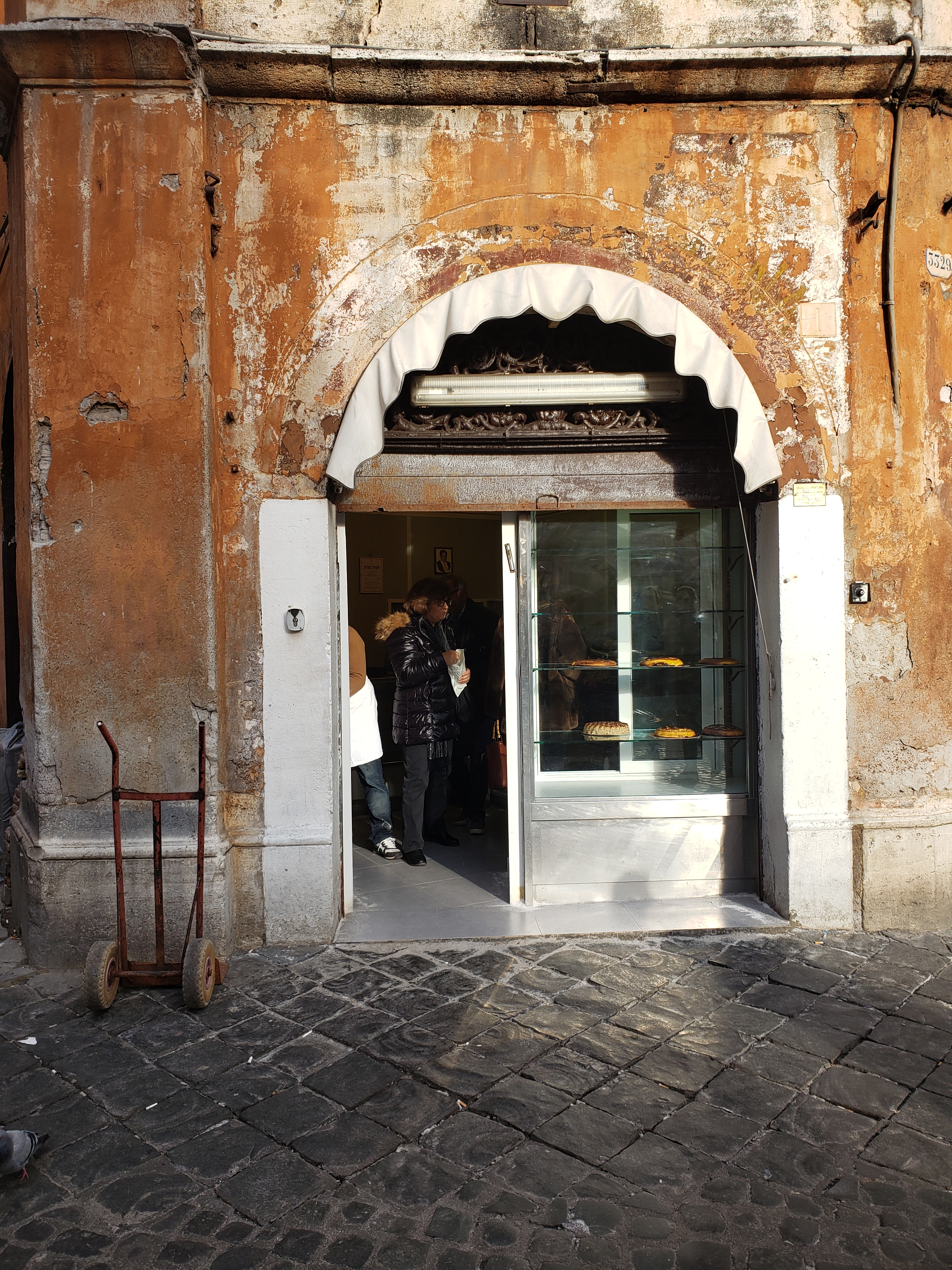
- Interactive map of Pasticceria Boccione

Restaurant information
- Established: 1815
- Owner: Limentani Family
- Food type: Kosher bakery
- Location: Via del Portico d'Ottavia, 1, Rome, Italy

Pasticceria Boccione is a kosher bakery in the Roman Ghetto. Established in 1815 by the Limentani family, Boccione is best known for its sour cherry and ricotta tart (Italian: crostata di ricotta e visciole) and pizza ebraica, a sweet bread filled with toasted almonds, candied ginger, marzipan, pine nuts, egg, maraschino cherries and raisins. A small, unmarked store on the area's main street, The New York Times described Boccione's crostata as the "best in Rome". The pizza ebraica was reportedly Pope Benedict XVI's favorite dessert.

The Limentani family has operated Pasticceria Boccione since it was founded. Noted for its "grumpy" staff – Graziella Limentani, three of her granddaughters, and a niece in 2019 – it is the last remaining kosher bakery in the Ghetto. An hours-long queue regularly begins to form prior to Pasticceria Boccione's morning opening.
