= Quattro Fontane =

Baroque fountain complex in Rome, Italy

- Fountain
- {{{other_names}}}
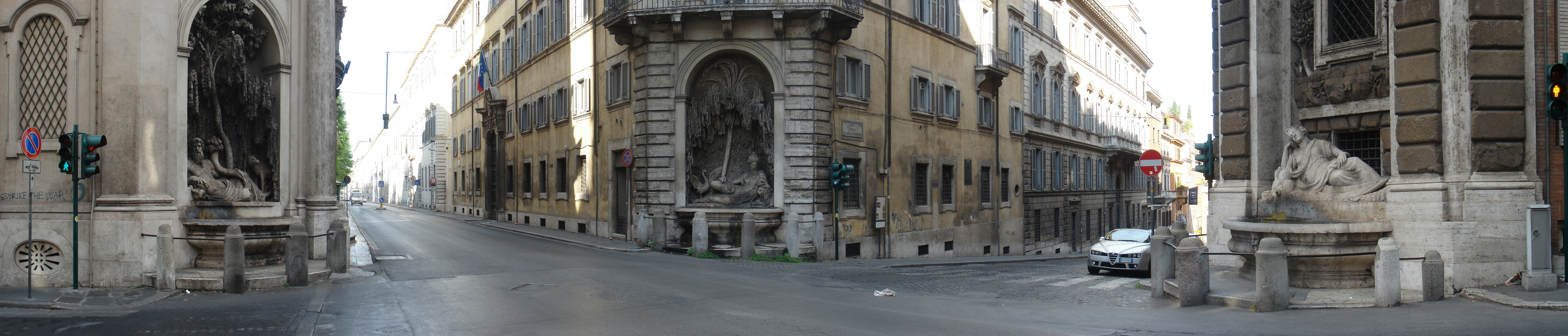
- The Quattro Fontane, Rome
- Design: Muzio Mattei
- Location: Via delle Quattro Fontane, Rome, Italy
- Interactive map of Quattro Fontane
- Coordinates: 41°54′7.07″N 12°29′26.58″E

The Quattro Fontane (the Four Fountains) is an ensemble of four Late Renaissance fountains located at the intersection of Via delle Quattro Fontane and Via del Quirinale in Rome. They were commissioned by Pope Sixtus V and built at the direction of Muzio Mattei, and were installed between 1588 and 1593.

== Design ==
The figure of one fountain is said to represent the River Tiber, in front of an oak-tree; a she-wolf, the symbol of Rome, was a later addition. A second fountain represents the River Arno. The other two fountains feature female figures believed to represent the Goddess Diana; the symbol of Chastity; and the Goddess Juno, the symbol of Strength, but it is possible that they may also represent rivers. The fountains of the Arno, Tiber, and Juno are the work of Domenico Fontana. The fountain of Diana was designed by the painter and architect Pietro da Cortona.

== History ==
The later Baroque church of San Carlo alle Quattro Fontane, by Francesco Borromini, is located near the fountains, and takes its name from them. Until 1964 the Via Quattro Fontane was home to the Pontifical Scots College.

== Gallery ==
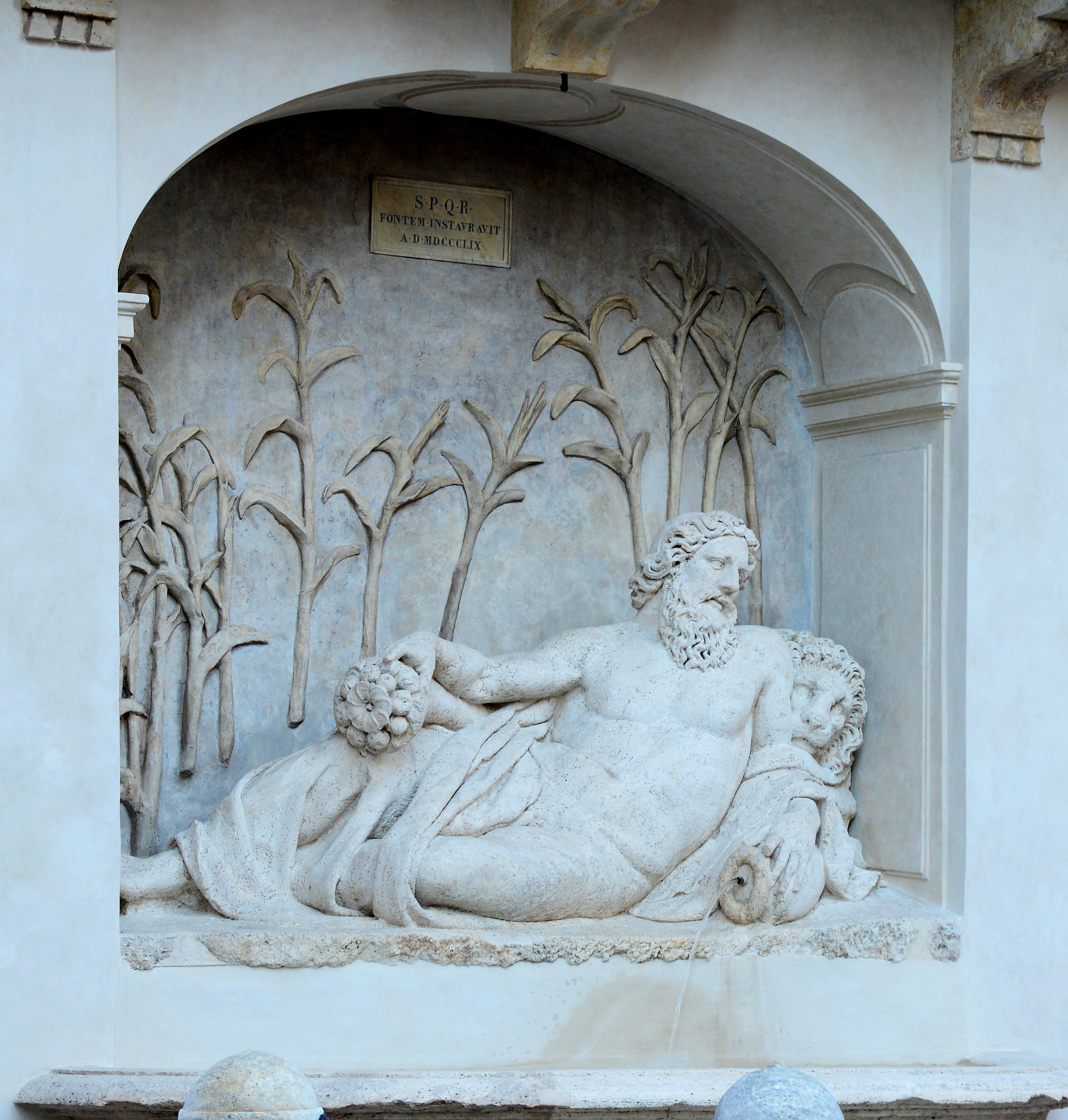
The River Aniene

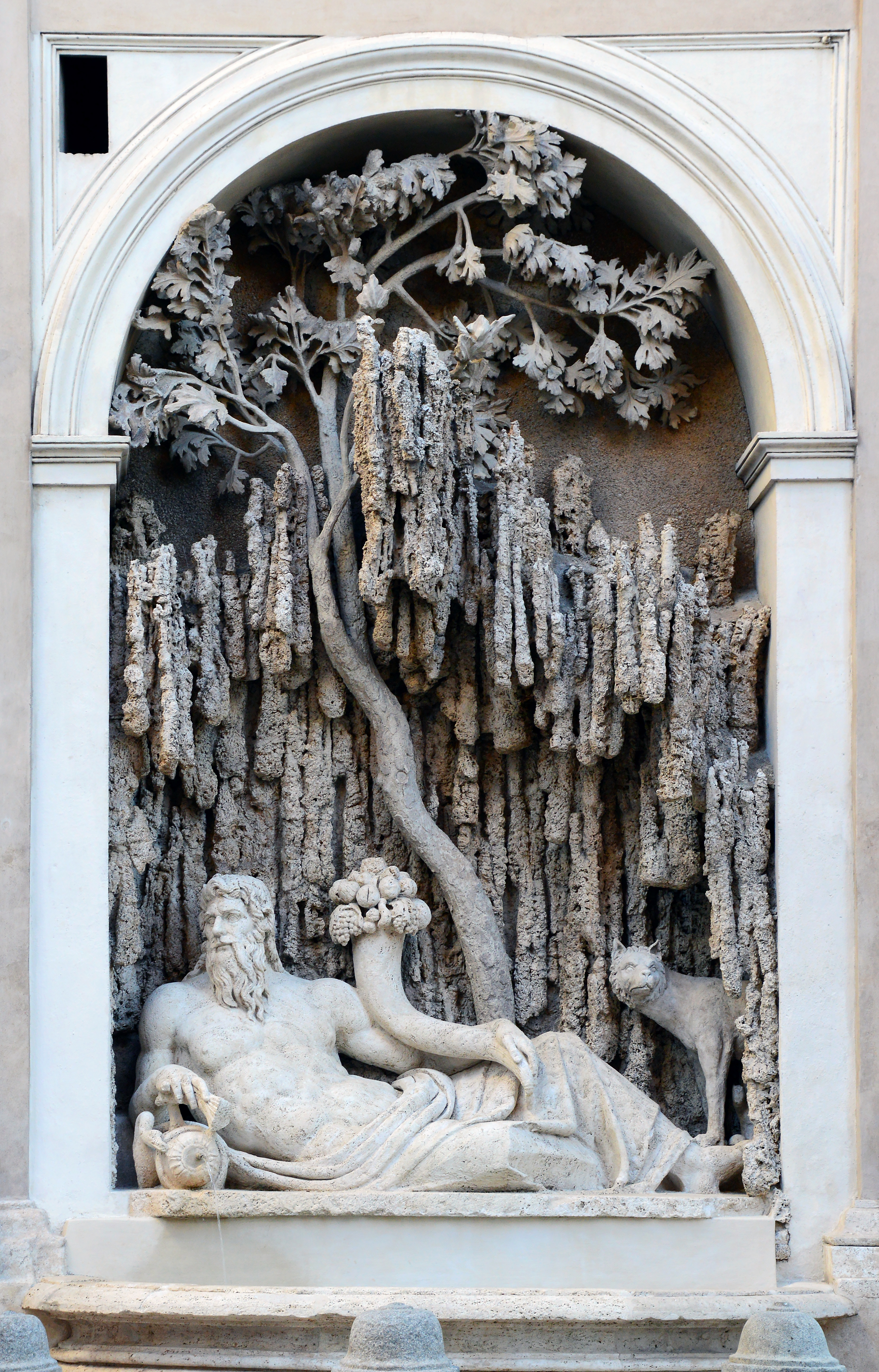
The River Tiber

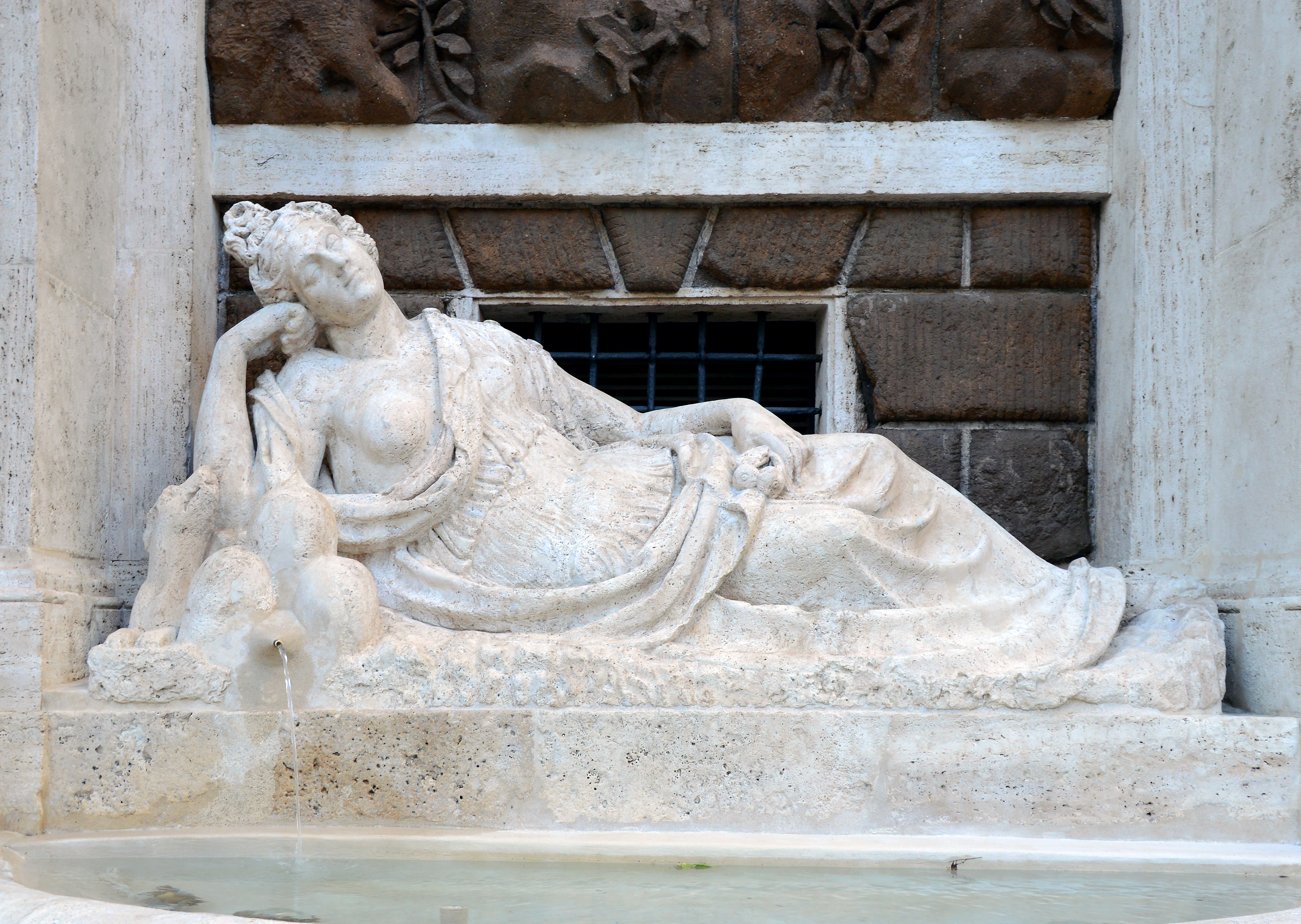
The goddess Diana

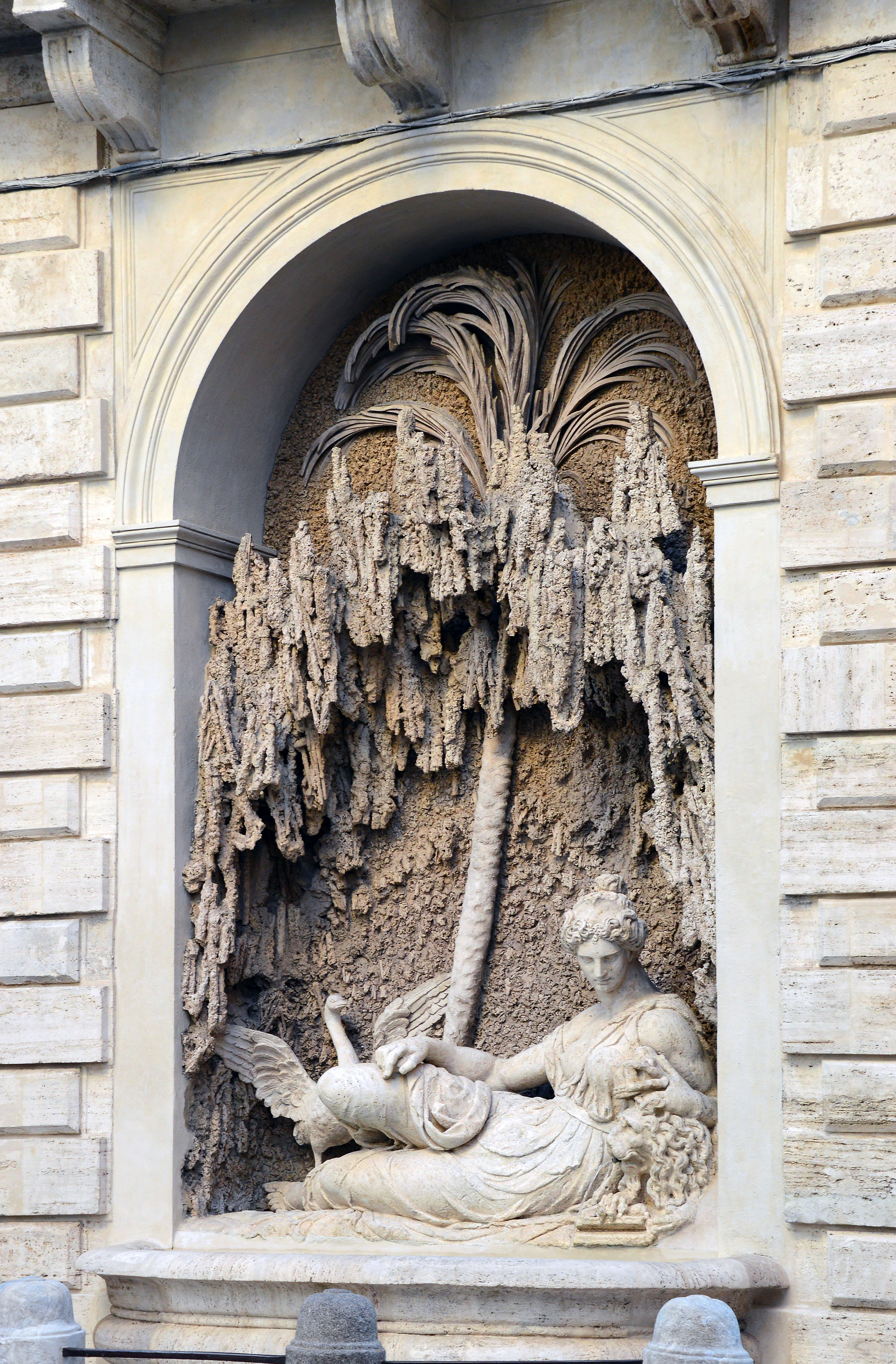
The goddess Juno

| Preceded by Fontana dei Quattro Fiumi | Landmarks of Rome; Quattro Fontane | Succeeded by Fontana delle Tartarughe |
