= Fontana delle Tartarughe =

Fountain in Rome, Italy

Coordinates: 41°53′38″N 12°28′39″E

- Fountain
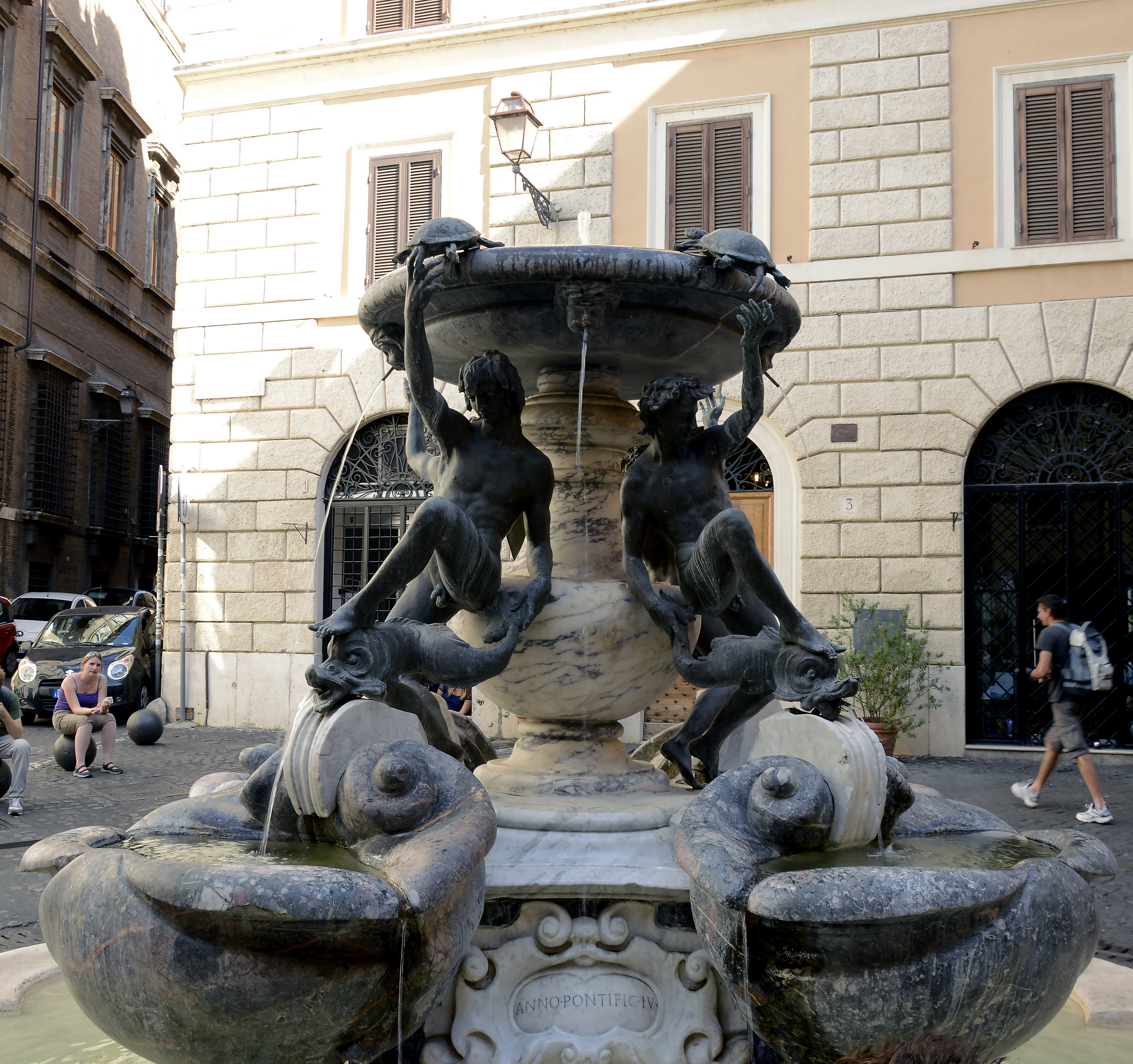
- Fontana delle Tartarughe, in Piazza Mattei
- Design: Giacomo Della Porta
- Location: Piazza Mattei, Rome, Italy
- Interactive map of Fontana delle Tartarughe
- Coordinates

The Fontana delle Tartarughe (The Turtle Fountain) is a fountain of the late Italian Renaissance, located in Piazza Mattei, in the Sant'Angelo district of Rome, Italy. It was built between 1580 and 1588 by the architect Giacomo della Porta and the sculptor Taddeo Landini. The bronze turtles around the upper basin, usually attributed either to Gian Lorenzo Bernini or Andrea Sacchi, were added in either 1658 or 1659 when the fountain was restored.

== History ==
=== The source of the water - the Acqua Vergine Aqueduct ===
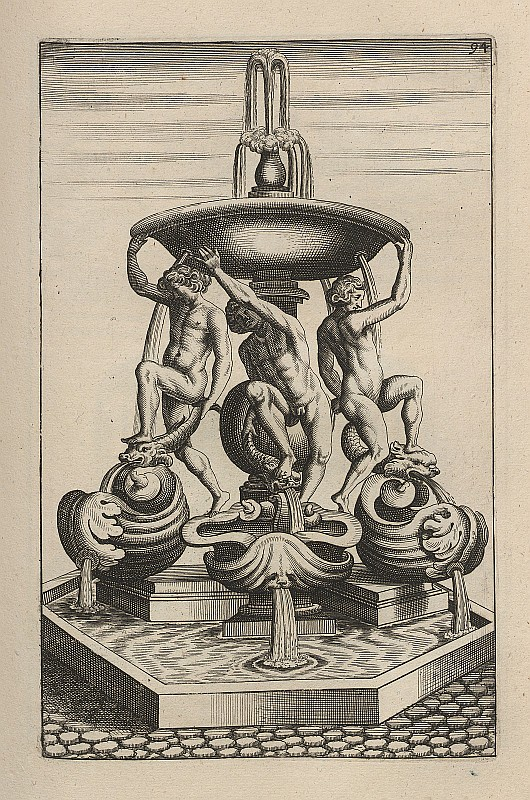
A copy of an engraving of the fountain made in 1664. It does not show the turtles, which were added in 1658 or 1659 when the fountain was restored.

The Fontana delle Tatarughe, like all Renaissance fountains, was designed to supply drinking water to the Roman population. It was one of a group of eighteen new fountains built in Rome in the sixteenth century following the restoration of a ruined first century Roman aqueduct, the Acqua Vergine, by Pope Gregory XIII.

The Acqua Vergine had been one of the first Roman aqueducts, opened by Marcus Agrippa, a chief aide of emperor Augustus, in 19 b.c. It carried water from the village of Salone in the Alban Hills, nine miles north of Rome, and ended in a fountain near the Pantheon. It was known for the purity of its water. The aqueduct was destroyed by the Visigoths in the 6th century, then partially restored by Pope Adrian I (772-795) in the 8th century. Through the Middle Ages it was the only aqueduct supplying drinking water to Roman fountains; the rest of the city's drinking water came from the Tiber River.

In 1561, Pope Pius IV decided to completely reconstruct the aqueduct. The project was given to the Papal architect, Giacomo della Porta (1532–1602), who built some of Rome's most famous fountains, and also completed the dome of St. Peter's Basilica following Michelangelo's and rebuilt the facades of some of Rome's major churches. The reconstruction of the aqueduct was finished in August 1570, with the first water flowing to a reservoir near the present Trevi Fountain.

Della Porta and the city of Rome made a plan to build eighteen new fountains connected to the new aqueduct. He began in 1572 with the fountain in Piazza del Popolo, then built the two famous fountains of Piazza Navona (1574–1578), and the fountain in Piazza della Rotonda in front of the Pantheon (1575). +

In the original plan of 1570 a new fountain was to have been placed near the Theater of Marcellus in the Piazza Giudia, the site of a market in the Roman Ghetto. One of the members of the committee that selected the sites of the fountains was the Roman nobleman Muzio Mattei, Mattei used his influence and money to have the fountain location moved to the small Piazza Mattei, in the block where the members of his family lived.

=== The Patron of the Fountain, Muzio Mattei ===
In 1580, the authorities of Rome agreed to move the water channel for the new fountain from its original site to the Piazza Mattei. In exchange for moving the fountain to the place in front of his home, Muzio Mattei agreed to pay the cost of the maintenance of the fountain, and to pave the square.

The Fontana delle Tartarughe is one of the few fountains in Rome built not for a Pope, but for a private patron. Muzio Mattei was a member of the House of Mattei; a family of bankers and politicians whose family lines went back to an early Roman family, the Papareschi, and whose ancestors included Pope Innocent II (1130–1143). In the 1350s the family moved to the Rione Sant Angelo, and they eventually built six residences in the block called the Isola Mattei. Though they lived in the Roman Ghetto, the historic Jewish quarter, they were Roman Catholic. When Pope Paul IV decided to build a wall around the Ghetto in 1555 and imprison the Jewish population, the Mattei were given a key to the gate.

Muzio's nephew Girolamo Mattei was appointed Cardinal under Pope Sixtus V, and another nephew, Asdrubale Mattei, was an important art patron; in 1598-1616 he commissioned the architect Carlo Maderno to build the Palazzo Mattei di Giove close to the fountain, and accumulated a notable art collection.

=== The design of the fountain ===
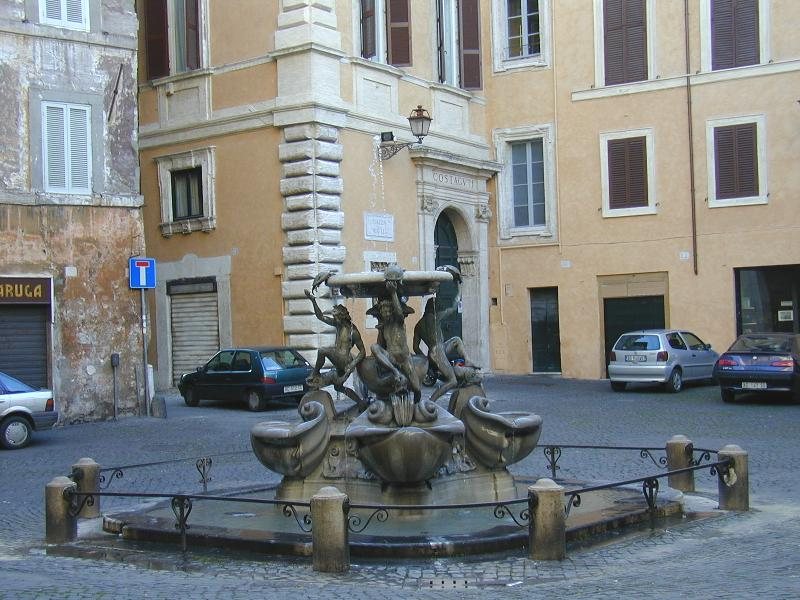
Piazza Mattei and the Fontana delle Tartarughe

The fountain was designed by the architect Giacomo della Porta (1533–1602) in 1581. He used a design which he repeated in several fountains, which he adapted from earlier ancient Roman fountains. It had a single vasque, or bowl, on a pedestal, from which water spouted upwards and then poured down into polygonal basin. What made the fountain in Piazza Mattei different was the decoration; Mattei commissioned the young sculptor Taddeo Landini, (1550–1596) for his first sculptural commission in Rome, to create statues of four ephebes, or young adolescent men, and eight dolphins. They were originally intended to be of marble but were finally made of bronze, which was more expensive. The Ephebes, in the mannerist style, may have been inspired by eight bronze figures made in 1563-1565 by Bartolomeo Ammannati for the Fountain of Neptune, or du Biancone, in Florence.

The fountain is composed of square basin with a circular vasque of African marble mounted on a pedestal in the center. Around the edge of the vasque are the four heads of putti which spout water into the basin below. There are four marble conch shells surrounding the base of the fountain. The four bronze ephebes are placed around the vasque of fountain, each resting one foot on the head of a bronze dolphin, reaching down to hold the tail of the dolphin, and raising up one hand toward the edge of the vasque. Water pours out of the mouths of the dolphins into the conch shells, then into the basin below.

=== The problem of water ===
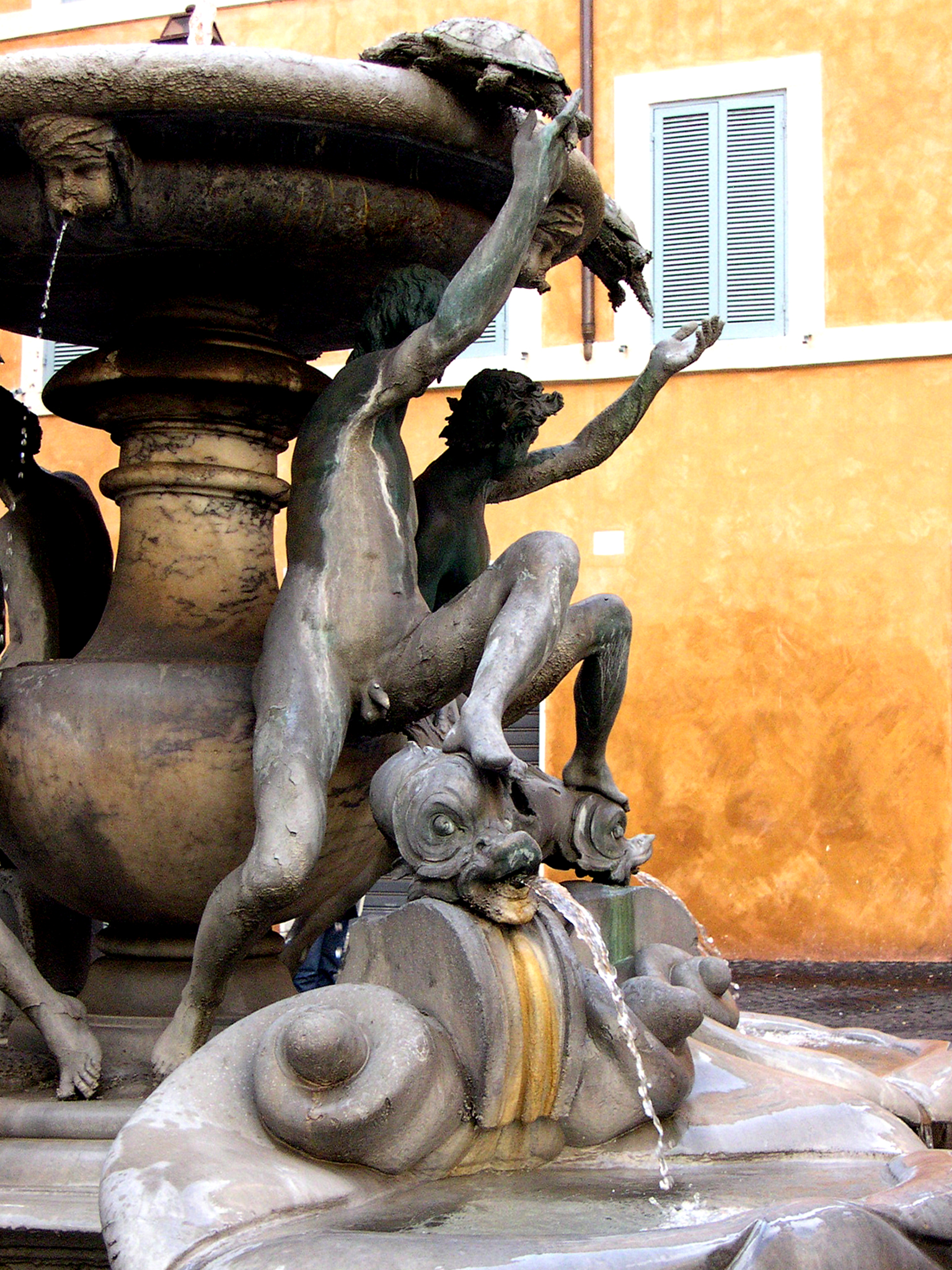
The ephebes, the turtles, and the dolphins

The fountain almost immediately had a problem of water supply. All the fountains of Rome functioned by gravity- the source of the water had to be higher than the fountain, and the height that the water could jet upwards was determined by the difference in elevation between the source and the fountain. All of the fountains connected to the Acqua Vergine aqueduct had the same problem- the immediate source of the water, a reservoir near the Piazza Spagna, was only sixty-seven feet above sea level, with only a twenty-three foot fall over the entire system. As a result, the Fonta delle Tartarughe had only a feeble flow of water.

To resolve this problem, the fountain was modified soon after it was finished. Four of the dolphins which were intended to spout water, probably supported by the hands of the ephebes, were removed and moved to another fountain, the Fontana della Terrina, which was then in the Campo de'Fiori, before being moved to a new site in front of the new church of Santa Maria in Vallicella The fountain in Piazza Mattei was left with a single upward jet of water in the vasque which filled the bowl, which drained through the mouths of the puti into the lower basin, and four small streams through the mouths of the dolphins which flowed into the conch shells.

The fountain apparently served the whole neighborhood. Drinking water was carried from the fountain to homes around the neighborhood by servants, family members, or paid water porters. Early engravings show that, after the fountain was opened, an ancient Roman sarcophagus was placed next to it to serve as a watering trough for horses, to keep that water separate from the drinking water for people.

=== Critical reaction ===
The fountain, which then was called simply the Fontana delli Mattei or Fons Mattheiorum, was a popular and critical success. In 1588, the writer Girolamo Ferrucci called it "the most beautiful and perfect fountain in Rome."

The fountain was the subject of engravings and drawings by such artists as Giovanni Battista Falda, which spread its fame. In 1642, the artist and critic Giovannin Baglione also praised the fountain's beauty, calling it a tribute to the virtue of its patron.

In the seventeenth century the fountain was often misattributed to either Raphael or to Michelangelo, which added to its popularity and reputation.

=== The addition of the turtles ===
The original fountain design called for four bronze dolphins on the upper vasque, supported by the upraised hands of the four young men. With the removal of the four dolphins because of the low water pressure, the upraised hands of the statues seemed to have no purpose.

Probably to correct this problem and balance the composition, the four turtles around the edge of the vasque were added during a restoration of the fountain between 1658 and 1659 ordered by Pope Alexander VII. They are usually attributed either to Gian Lorenzo Bernini or Andrea Sacchi. The date of the restoration is recorded on four scrolls of marble around the fountain.

The turtles are very realistic; If their creator was Bernini, he may have used casts of a real turtle, as he did with sculptures he made of other living creatures.

=== Recent history ===
In 1853–54, during a brief period of puritanism in Rome, leaves were placed over the sexual organs of the boys. In 1979 one of the turtles was stolen from the fountain. After the theft the original turtles were replaced by copies. The statue was equipped with a water purification system to prevent the buildup of calcium deposits, which had required the frequent cleaning of the fountain. The water purification system was replaced in 2003 and the marble and bronze of the fountain were extensively restored and preserved in 2006.

== The iconography of the turtle fountain ==
Art historians have presented various theories about the iconography of the fountain, particularly about the odd contraposto posture of the bronze figures and the presence of the bronze turtles, which were added in 1658 or 1659. Some historians say the upraised hands of the male figures were meant to hold up the four bronze dolphins which were removed when the fountain opened because of insufficient water pressure to make them spout water. The turtles were added simply to balance the composition and to give a reason for the upraised arms of the figures.

Other historians note that Roman fountain statuary in the Renaissance usually told a story or represented a virtue which their patron believed he possessed. The German historian Phillip Fehl suggested that the theme of the fountain was "Festina lente," the neoplatonic saying "make haste slowly," contrasting the speed of the dolphins and the slowness of the turtles.

Norwegian art historian Anne Kristine Togstad believes that the male figures and turtles are both connected to the Roman and Greek legend of Jupiter and Ganymede. The legend recounts how the god Jupiter fell in love with the handsome young shepherd Ganymede. Jupiter transformed himself into an eagle and lifted Ganymede to the sky, where he became immortal and the cupbearer to the gods. In 1597 the Mattei family acquired the territory of Giove, the Italian name for Jupiter, and built a new residence near the fountain called Palazzo Mattei di Giove. They embellished their houses with emblems, paintings and sculptures with the eagle of Jupiter and representations of Ganymede. The upraised arms of the figures in the fountain resembles the posture of classical Roman representations of Ganymede being abducted by the eagle. The turtle was associated in mythology with Jupiter.

== Legend ==
A popular Roman legend claims that a Duke Muzio Mattei, ruined by gambling, ordered the fountain to be built overnight in order to win the trust of the wealthy father of a woman he wished to marry. The next morning he opened the window of his palazzo and showed his future father in law the fountain. The father was impressed and allowed the marriage to go ahead, and the Duke, to remember the event, had the window overlooking the fountain closed up. A window closed by brick still overlooks the fountain.

The story is probably only a legend; sceptics note that it would have been very difficult to construct such a complex fountain in the dark without making any noise in a single night. According to historians such as Maurizia Tazertes the fountain was built over a long period between 1581 and 1588, and the Palazzo Mattei di Giove, the main residence of the Mattei, was not completed until 1616.

Defenders of the legend point out that the Palazzo Giacomo Mattei, the earlier residence of the Mattei family, which stands directly in front of the fountain, was built in the early 16th century, before the fountain was built, and thus the legend could be true.

== Copies ==
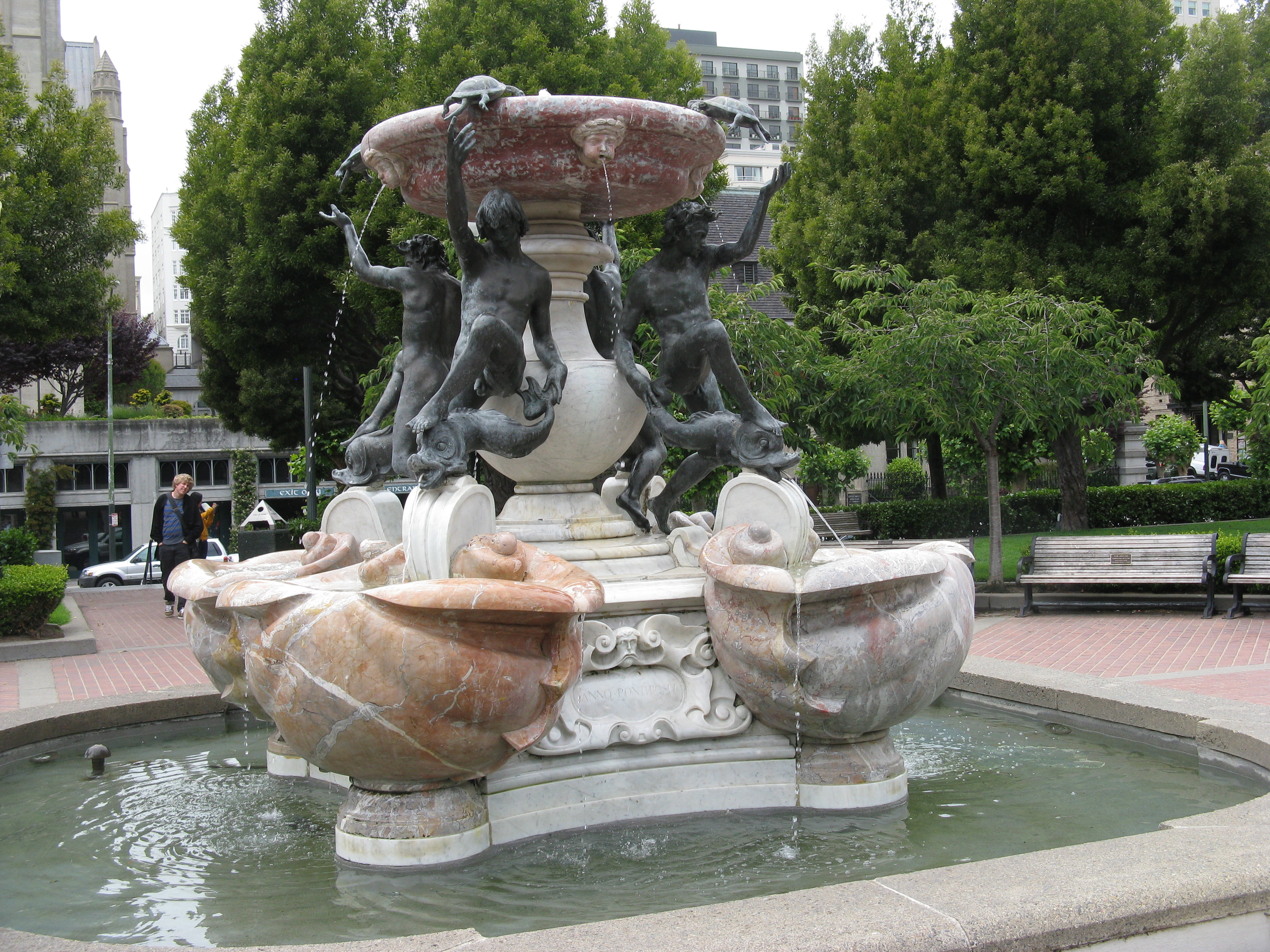
A replica at Huntington Park

A replica of the fountain, made in Rome in the early 1900s, was bought by William H. and Ethel Crocker for their estate at Hillsborough, California. It was given to the city of San Francisco by their four children and installed in Huntington Park, Nob Hill, in 1954. It stands rather lower in the water than the Roman original.

There are four documented replicas of Fontana Delle Tartarughe in the United States, located in Bloomfield Hills, Michigan; Sarasota, Florida; San Francisco, California; and at the Elms mansion in Newport, Rhode Island.

Turtle Fountain in Bloomfield Hills, Michigan is situated on a circular terrace alongside Cranbrook House. In recent years the fountain was restored, funded by Cranbrook House and Gardens Auxiliary.

== Cinema ==
The fountain and the Piazza Mattei appear in the 1968 war movie Anzio, when a reconnaissance party enters the city in a Jeep.

The fountain also appears in a few scenes of The Talented Mr. Ripley, the 1999 film directed by Anthony Minghella.

== See also ==
- List of fountains in Rome

== Sources ==
- Maurizia Tazartes, Fontaines de Rome, French edition, translated from Italian by Christine Piot. Citadelles and Mazenod, Paris, 2004.
- Willy Pochino, Le fontane di Roma, Rome, 1996.
- H. V. Morton, The Waters of Rome, London 1970
- Anne Kristine Togstad, Fontana delle Tartarughe- the iconography of a Roman fountain, University of Oslo, 2005. (Doctoral Thesis whose full text is available online.).
- D'Onofrio, Cesare, Le Fontane di Roma, con documenti e disegni inediti, 2nd edition, Rome, 1962

Preceded by Quattro Fontane	Landmarks of Rome; Fontana delle Tartarughe	Succeeded by Trevi Fountain
