= Roman Ghetto =

Jewish ghetto in Rome, Italy

- Ghetto di Roma (Italian)
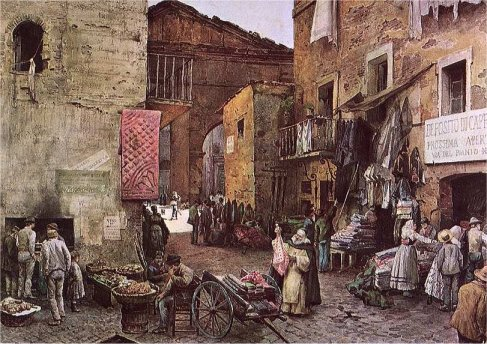
- Via Rua in Ghetto, (rione Sant'Angelo), by Ettore Roesler Franz (c. 1880)
- Interactive map of Roman Ghetto
- 41°53′33″N 12°28′39″E

History
- Established: 1555
- Demolished: 1888

Site notes
- Architect: Giovanni Sallustio Peruzzi

The Roman Ghetto or Ghetto of Rome (Italian: Ghetto di Roma) was a Jewish ghetto established in 1555 by Pope Paul IV in the Rione Sant'Angelo, in Rome, Italy, in the area surrounded by present-day Via del Portico d'Ottavia, Lungotevere dei Cenci, Via del Progresso and Via di Santa Maria del Pianto, close to the River Tiber and the Theatre of Marcellus. With the exception of brief periods under Napoleon from 1808 to 1815 and under the Roman Republics of 1798–99 and 1849, the ghetto of Rome was controlled by the papacy until the capture of Rome in 1870.

== Creation ==
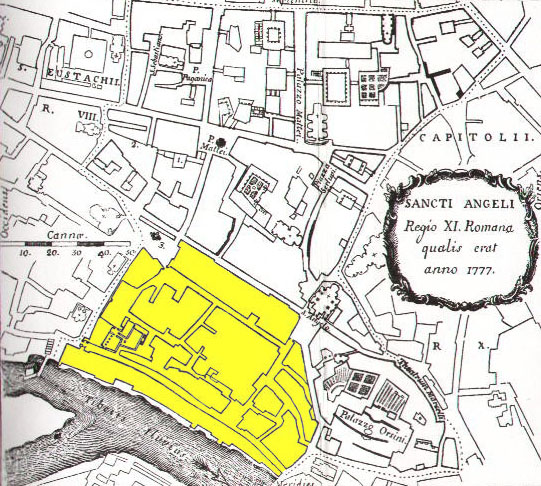
Map of the Rione Sant'Angelo from 1777, coloured to show the extent of the ghetto at that time

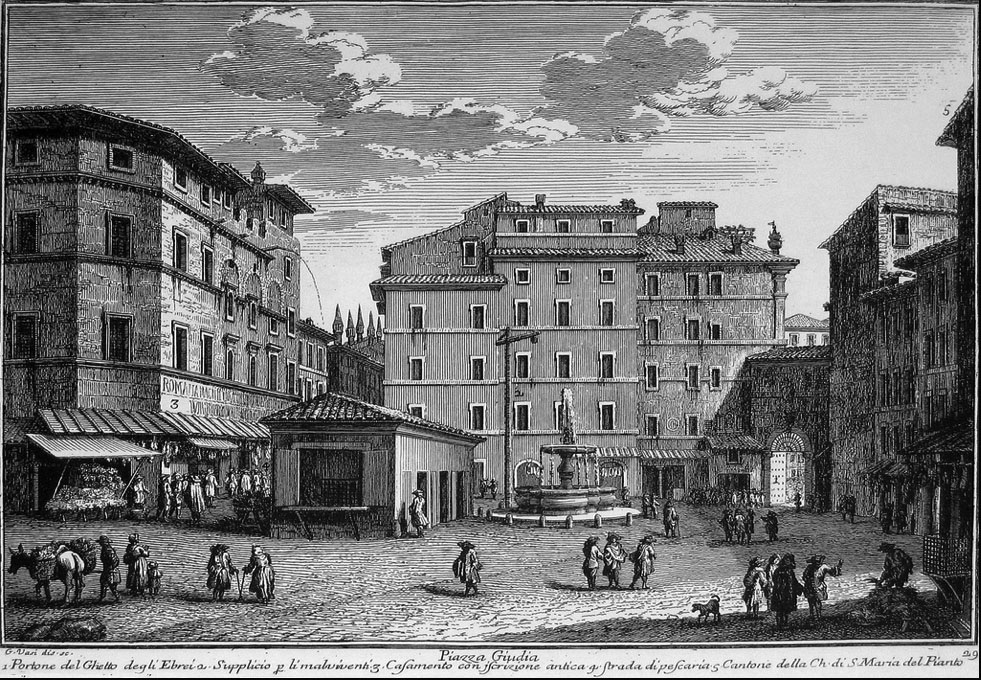
Piazza Giudia, showing the gate of the ghetto (middle right), the police post and the gallows; engraving from: Giuseppe Vasi, Delle Magnificenze di Roma antica e moderna: Tome II, Le Piazze principali di Roma, con obelischi, colonne ed altri ornamenti. Roma: Stamperia degli eredi Barbiellini, 1752

The Jewish community of Rome is probably the oldest in the world outside of the Middle East, with a continuous existence from classical times down to the present day. The first record of Jews in Rome is in 161 BC, when Jason b. Eleazar and Eupolemus b. Johanan are said to have gone there as envoys from Judah Maccabee.

Eugene IV, by the bull Dudum ad nostram audientiam (Aug 8, 1442) ordered the complete separation of Jews and Christians. Regarding their separation, article 8 of the bull stated:

Inter christianos non habitent sed infra certum viculum seu locum a christianis separati et segregati, extra quem nullatenus mansiones habere valeant, inter se degant.
Let them not live among Christians, but within certain streets or place, separated and segregated from Christians; outside of which they may in no way be allowed to have dwellings, let them live among themselves.

The Roman Ghetto was established as a result of papal bull Cum nimis absurdum, promulgated by Pope Paul IV on 14 July 1555. The bull also required the Jews of Rome, which had existed as a community since before Christian times and which numbered about 2,000 at the time, to live in the ghetto. The ghetto was a walled quarter with its gates locked at night. The wall was built under the direction of the architect Giovanni Sallustio Peruzzi. The cost of the wall's construction, 300 Roman scudi, had to be paid by the Jewish community. The area of Rome chosen for the ghetto was one of the most undesirable quarters of the city, subject to constant flooding by the Tiber River, but where Jews amounted already to 80% of the population. At the time of its founding, the area was a trapezoid whose bases (parallel to the river) measured respectively 270 m (890 ft) (near the Tiber) and 180 m (590 ft), and whose sides was about 150 m (490 ft) long. The wall started from Ponte Fabricio reaching the Portico d'Ottavia; from there it ran along today's Via del Portico d'Ottavia (not including the ancient fish market (Italian: La Pescheria)); at Piazza Giudea (which was cut in two), it bent again, running along Vicolo Cenci (today Via del Progresso) until it reached the Tiber again. The total area amounted to 3 hectares (7.4 acres). At the time of Sixtus V (late 1580s), roughly 3,500 inhabitants were living in inhuman conditions.

The bull formally revoked all political and social rights of the Jewish community and imposed on Jews a variety of new restrictions, such as barring them from practicing medicine or law. Jewish worshippers were required to hear Catholic sermons denouncing their faith and participate in Catholic rituals during the Jewish sabbath.

Jews were not allowed to own any property, even within the ghetto. Christian owners of houses in the ghetto could keep their property, but, because of the jus gazzagà (right of possession), they could neither evict the Jews nor raise rents. (Note: About, 96: Around 1860, rent for a large apartment in the ghetto was 30 scudi per month; the rent had remained the same since the reign of Urban VIII. The same apartment on the free market cost 450 scudi.)

Gates were added as the ghetto was successively enlarged. Initially, there were two gates in the wall. The number increased to three in the 16th century and under Sixtus V to five, and finally, during the 19th century to eight. The gates were opened at dawn and closed every night, one hour after sunset between November and Easter, and two hours at other times. The area contained hardly any noteworthy buildings. The only important square — Piazza Giudea (Note: Pietrangeli, 45: On the square were placed the barracks of the gendarmes which controlled the ghetto, and there was practiced the torment of the strappado ("la corda").) — was divided in two parts by the wall. All the churches which stood in the ghetto were deconsecrated and demolished soon after its construction.

In common with many other Italian ghettoes, the ghetto of Rome was not initially so called, but was variously referred to in documents in Italian as serraglio degli Ebrei or claustro degli Ebrei, both meaning "enclosure of the Hebrews". Various forms of the word ghetto came into use in the late 16th century. The modern Roman Jewish usage is ghétte.

== Life in the ghetto ==
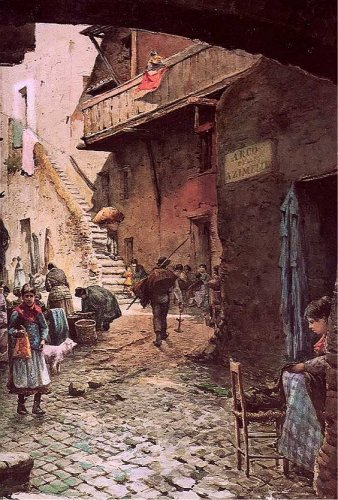
Disappeared Ghetto: Arco delle Azimelle in a watercolour by Ettore Roesler Franz (1880 ca.). The Azimelle are Jewish unleavened breads, which were produced in a bakery in this lane.

Life in the Roman Ghetto was one of crushing poverty, due to the severe restrictions placed upon the occupations that Jews were allowed to perform. Roman Jews were allowed to work only at unskilled jobs, such as ragmen, secondhand dealers or fish mongers. They were permitted to be pawnbrokers and moneylenders (which had been prohibited to Christians), and so were often the target of insults and violence by Catholics.

In the lottery game, they were allowed to bet only on low numbers (from 1 through 30), and all belonging to the same group of 10. (Note: This law was established because, since Jews had the reputation of being sorcerers, the Romans believed that they could win by witchcraft. Otherwise, usually the Italian lottery is played betting on up to five numbers ranging from 1 through 90. Zanazzo, 143.) In case of a draw of five numbers of that kind, the Romans said that on that day in the ghetto there was taking place a great feast.

When Jews went outside the ghetto, the men had to wear a yellow cloth (the "sciamanno"), and the women a yellow veil (the same color worn by prostitutes). During Catholic feasts, groups of Jews were physically dragged from the ghetto and made to humiliate themselves for the amusement of the guests. They had to run naked with ropes around their necks, or with their legs closed into sacks. Other times, they were made to walk on all fours while being ridden like horses. (Note: These habits were usual also before the erection of the ghetto. For example, Pope Alexander VI was a fan of such competitions. He chose not to pave the new road named Borgo Nuovo, which he opened in 1500 in Borgo, in order to keep a better ground for the runners.)

A particularly specific insult was that the Jews were required to "petition" (essentially beg) for the right to not have their ghetto torn down and be banished from Rome. A tax was paid every year, and oaths of loyalty were sworn by all adult Jews at the Arch of Titus, which celebrates the Roman sack of Jerusalem of 70 CE. Each year, on the Campidoglio, the chief Rabbi was made to publicly pay homage to the senior councilor of the Roman city council ("Caporione"), and afterwards had to bend over and allow himself to be kicked in the rear. This "ceremony" meant that the Jewish community had been allowed to stay one more year in Rome. (Note: This tradition was interrupted by Pius IX in 1847. About, 96.)

Every Saturday, the Jewish community was required by law to sit for hours while priests delivered sermons urging them to convert to the "true faith" (Note: It is told that many Jews closed their ears with wax in order not to hear the sermon.) in front of the small church of San Gregorio a Ponte Quattro Capi, just outside the wall. (Note: On the façade of the church there is still an inscription of the prophet Isaiah (LXV, 2-3) in Hebrew and Latin, complaining about the stubbornness of the Jewish people.)

At the time of its construction, in the ghetto – as almost everywhere in Rome – there was no fresh water. However, some years later the Popes built several fountains in the rione. One fountain, designed by Giacomo della Porta, was to be placed in the Piazza Giudea, the site of a market, inside the ghetto, but Muzio Mattei used his influence to have the fountain, the Fontana delle Tartarughe (Turtle Fountain), located in the Piazza Mattei, in front of his residence. (Note: The fountain is now in Via del Progresso.)

As the Jewish community inside the ghetto grew, there was severe overcrowding. Since the area could not expand horizontally, the Jews built vertical additions to their houses, which blocked the sun from reaching the already dank and narrow streets.

The great number of people living in such a small area, (Note: The area of the ghetto, after the enlargement under Sixtus V, was slightly larger than three Hectares. Pietrangeli, 44.) together with the poverty of the population, caused terrible hygienic conditions. The district, lying very low and near the Tiber, was often flooded, and diseases like cholera and malaria were endemic. During the plague of 1656, 800 of the ghetto's 4,000 inhabitants died. In 1867, just three years before the abolition of the ghetto, there was a cholera epidemic. Sant'Angelo, which was the smallest rione by area, also had the highest population density because of the presence of the ghetto.

== Abolition ==
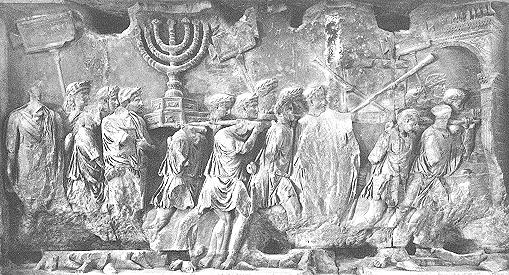
Detail from the Arch of Titus showing spoils from the Sack of Jerusalem

The first great upheaval since Paul IV established the ghetto came during the Napoleonic Wars. Eager to promulgate his own set of universal laws, Napoleon determined that every citizen under his rule would enjoy equal protection under the law. The Napoleonic Code eliminated many of the special rights and privileges enjoyed by aristocratic and religious figures; it also removed the special restrictions and burdens placed on Jewish communities. In Rome and other places this meant an end to Jewish ghettos. Upon the triumphant entrance of Napoleon's forces into the city, a special point was made of physically demolishing the old ghetto walls. This was not just a simple act of altruism. Napoleon was determined to show the Catholic Church that he was now the dominant power in Rome. In 1798 he abolished the Papal States and replaced them with a new Roman Republic, which quickly annulled the papal law requiring Jews to reside in the ghetto. To commemorate the event a Tree of Liberty was planted in Piazza delle Cinque Scole ("Piazza of the Five Synagogues"). However, when the Papal States were restored in 1799, the ghetto was reestablished and Jews who had left its confines were compelled to return.

During the 19th century it became clear the ghetto was becoming less and less sustainable. On 17 April 1847, a group of young men from Trastevere broke open the gates of the ghetto after they had been closed for the night. In 1848, at the liberal beginning of his pontificate, Pius IX permitted Jews to live outside the ghetto. Following a brief period of exile, however, during which time Rome was controlled by a second Roman Republic which strongly opposed Church power, the Pope issued a new series of anti-liberal measures, including re-instituting the ghetto. The Jewish head tax was abolished in 1850.

The Papal States ceased to exist on 20 September 1870, when they were combined with the rest of the peninsula into the newly created Kingdom of Italy. With this dramatic change in governments, the requirement that Jews live in the ghetto came to an end. But the centuries of crowds, restrictions, and disease had taken their toll. While the Roman ghetto had once been home to some 10,000 Jews, by 1870 the population was less than half that; half of those remaining relied on charity to survive. The Risorgimento troops who arrived to wrest control of Rome's government away from the Catholic Church were treated as liberators and conquering heroes by many Jewish residents. In 1888, the ghetto walls were torn down, and the ghetto itself was almost completely demolished. In 1904 the Great Synagogue of Rome and a number of apartment buildings were erected on the site. Embankments were created to prevent flooding and reduce the spread of disease.

The Roman Ghetto was the last remaining ghetto in Western Europe until ghettos were reintroduced by Nazi Germany in the 1930s.

== Legacy ==
Due to the three hundred plus years of isolation from the rest of the city, the Jews of the Roman Ghetto developed their own dialect, known as Giudeo-romanesco, which differs from the dialect of the rest of the city in its preservation of 16th-century dialectical forms and its liberal use of romanized Hebrew words.

Today, the district of the former ghetto is the home of the Great Synagogue of Rome. There is one remaining piece of the ghetto wall, which was built into the wall of one of the courtyards off the Piazza delle Cinque Scole. It is described as "one of the Rome's most charming and eclectic neighborhoods, [...with] restaurants serving up some of the best food in the city", such as the Roman Jewish speciality of fried artichokes, carciofi alla giudìa and filled zucchini blossoms, fiori di zucca.

== See also ==
- Raid on the Roman Ghetto by the Germans in 1943
- Sant'Angelo (rione of Rome)
- Jewish ghettos in Europe
- History of the Jews in Rome
- History of the Jews in Italy
- Samuel di Castelnuovo
- Pasticceria Boccione

== Further references ==
1. Chadwick, Owen (1998). A History of the Popes 1830-1914. Oxford University Press. pp. 128–129. ISBN 0-19-826922-6.

== Sources ==
- Baronio, Cesare (1697). Descrizione di Roma moderna (in Italian). M. A. and P. A. De Rossi, Roma.
- About, Edmond (1861). Rome contemporaine (in French). Hetzel, Paris.
- Zanazzo, Giggi (1907–1910). Usi, costumi e pregiudizi del popolo di Roma (in Italian). Torino – Roma.
- Delli, Sergio (1975). Le strade di Roma (in Italian). Newton Compton, Roma.
- Pietrangeli, Carlo (1976). Sant'Angelo. Guide rionali di Roma (in Italian). Fratelli Palombi, Roma.
- Staccioli, Romolo (1988). Roma entro le mura (in Italian). Fratelli Melita Roma.
- Agresti, Olivia Rossetti (1907). Giovanni Costa, his life, work, and times. 2nd edition London: Gay & Bird. (1st: London: Grant Richards, 1904)
- Debenedetti-Stow, Sandra (1992). "The Etymology of "Ghetto": New Evidence from Rome". Jewish History. The Frank Talmage Memorial Volume. 6 (1/2): 79–85. doi:10.1007/BF01695211. ISSN 0334-701X. JSTOR 20101121. S2CID 159880549. (subscription required).
- Lerner, L. Scott (Winter–Spring 2002). "Narrating Over the Ghetto of Rome". Jewish Social Studies. New Series. 8 (2/3): 1–38. doi:10.1353/jss.2002.0009. ISSN 0021-6704. (subscription required). Archived from the original on 2016-03-04.
- Stow, Kenneth R. Theater of Acculturation: The Roman Ghetto in the Sixteenth Century (Seattle: University of Washington Press, 2001). ISBN 978-0295980225
- Stow, Kenneth R. Jewish Life in Early Modern Rome: Challenge, Conversion, and Private Life (Aldershot, 2007). ISBN 9780754659167
- Lekić, Vedran (2004). Mahan, Matthew W. (ed.). Rome: A Let's Go City Guide (First ed.). Cambridge, MA: Macmillan. ISBN 1-4050-3329-0.
