= Stefaneschi =

Stefaneschi is an Italian surname. Notable people with the surname include:

- Giovanni Battista Stefaneschi (1582–1659), Italian Baroque painter
- Giacomo Gaetani Stefaneschi (c. 1270–1343), Italian Roman Catholic cardinal deacon
