= Camilli =

Camilli is an Italian surname, may refer to:

- Camillo Camilli, Italian luthier
- Carlo Camilli, Italian footballer
- Dolph Camilli, American baseball player
- Doug Camilli, American baseball player
- Emanuele Camilli, Olympic Italian show jumping rider
- Eric Camilli, French rally driver
- Gonzalo Camilli, former Uruguayan footballer
- Lou Camilli, American baseball player
- Frankie Campbell (born Francisco Camilli), American boxer

== See also ==
- Cəmilli (disambiguation)
