= Trajanic art =

Period in Roman art history

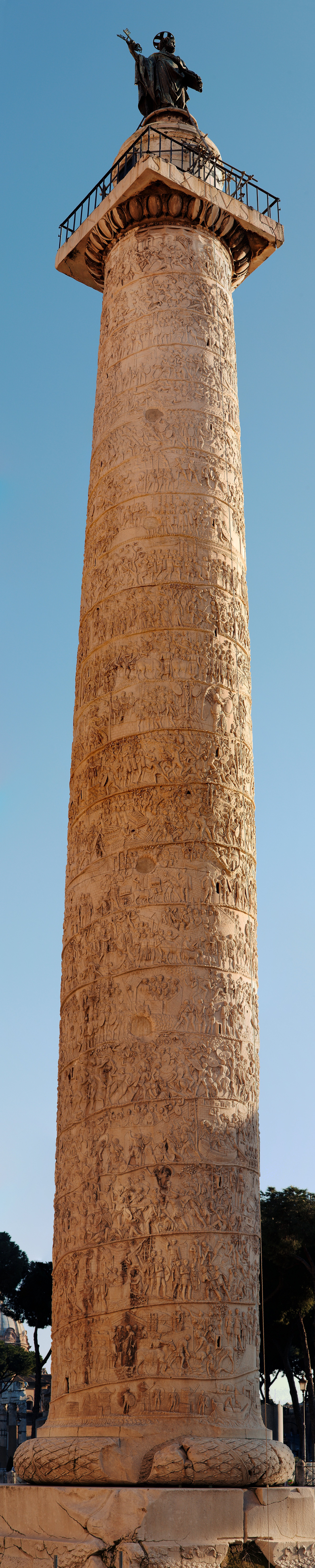
Trajan's Column

Trajanic art is the artistic production of the Roman Empire during the reign of Emperor Trajan from 98 to 117. In this period, Roman art further developed the innovations of the Flavian era, coming to definitively detach itself from Hellenistic influence.

== Historical context ==
Under Trajan, the Roman Empire reached its maximum expansion. This meant a new condition of well-being for Roman society, which, both in Rome and in the provinces, allowed the emergence of a vast middle class, capable of expressing its needs and its own taste in the artistic field.

At that time, the Roman state still had a widely shared semblance of a "presidential republic"; to justify the state of affairs at the time of Trajan, everything was focused on the observance of the laws and on consensus, cemented by solid financial security and on broad economic and commercial development.

== Sculpture ==
=== Imperial portraits ===
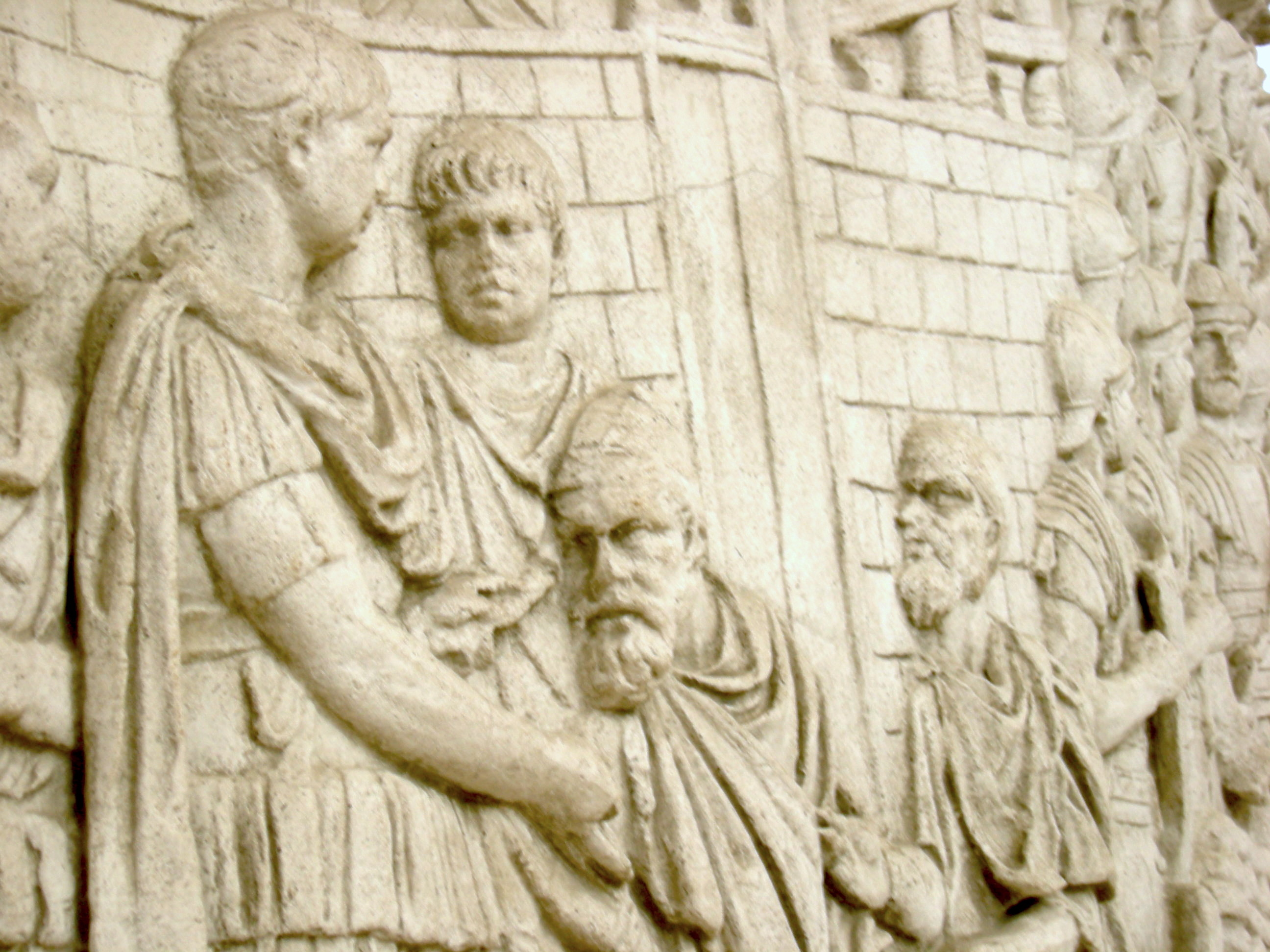
Trajan receives homage from a Dacian chieftain, plaster cast from Trajan's Column

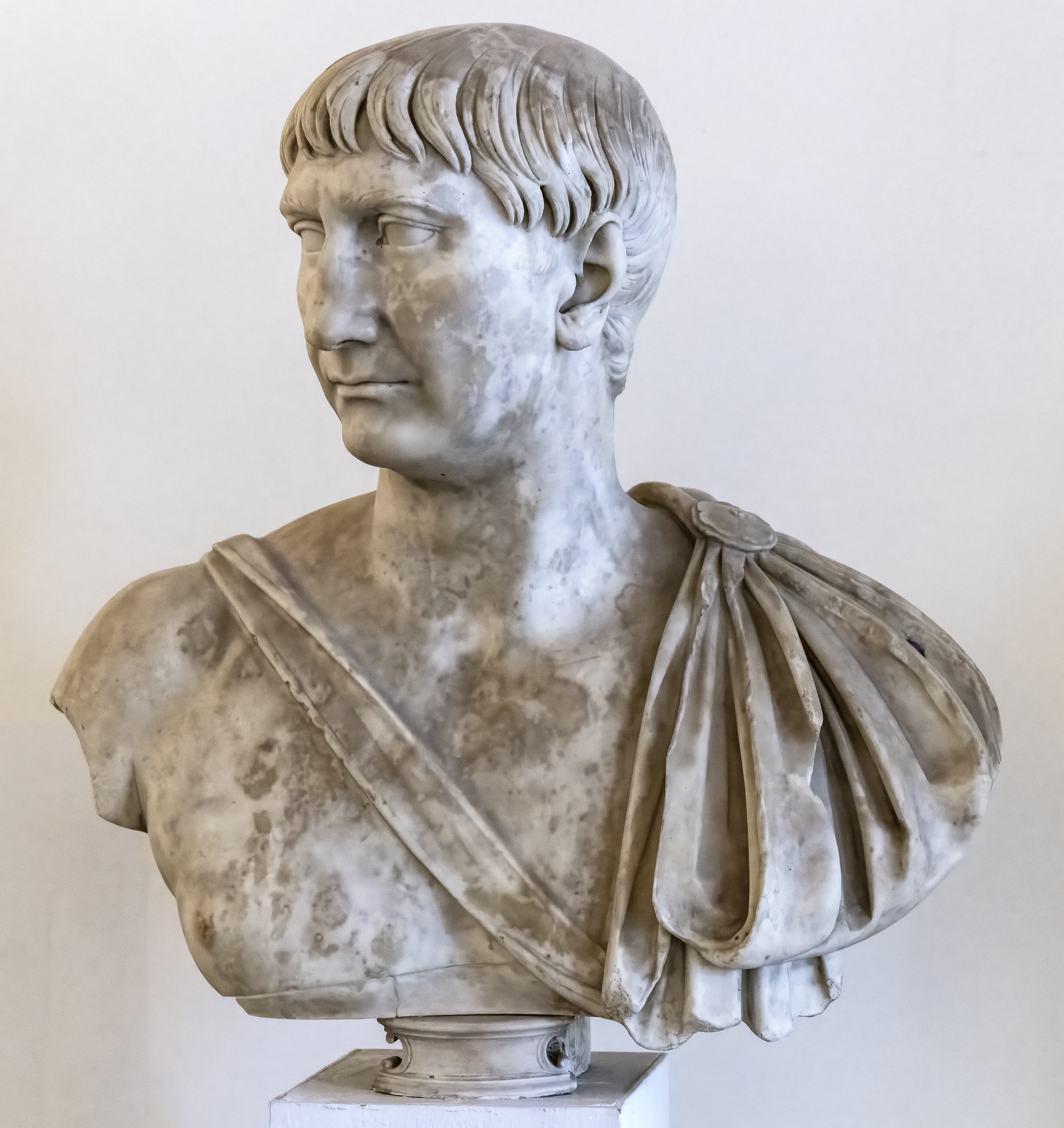
The "decennial" portrait of Trajan, c. 108

A new type of imperial portrait was created on the tenth anniversary of Trajan's rule, the so-called "portrait of the decennial". Seemingly devoid of emotion, this is a typical example of the realism of Roman private portraits: a simple and objective image with firm and calm features, however highlighting the authority and dignity of the subject. A merging is seen between two previously separate types of portraiture; the official, honorary, portrait, and the private, often funerary, portrait.

This attitude towards the figure of the emperor is seen in his depictions on Trajan's Column. Among the many small images, that of Trajan's conversation with one of his commanders (perhaps Lucius Licinius Sura) during the Second Dacian War stands out. With great formal simplicity, the emperor is depicted nonchalant while explaining a plan to the general, fixing him in the eyes and relaxing the palms of hands in front of him, according to an intense relationship of trust and respect between him and the subordinate, of an intelligent and virile conversation, devoid of any rhetoric or courtesy.

=== Trajan's Column ===
The reliefs of Trajan's Column produced in this period are considered not only masterpieces of Roman civilization, but of ancient art in general.

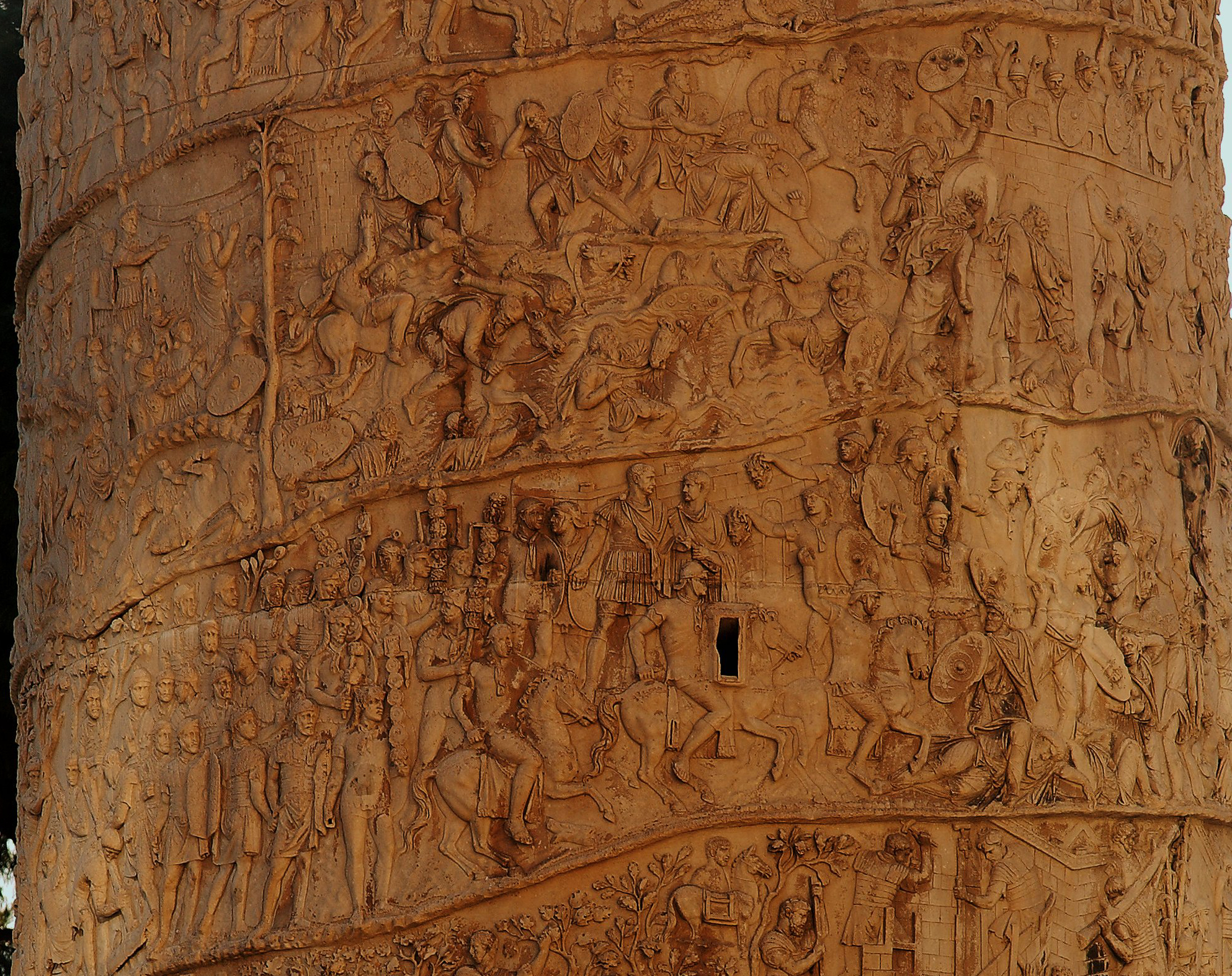
Reliefs on the Trajan's Column

The spiral-shaped column covered with reliefs was an absolute novelty in ancient art and became the most avant-garde arrival point of the Roman historical relief. The artist of the column frieze had in fact fully assimilated Hellenistic (and classical) art, further developing it in the wake of the Roman historical narrative, with motifs taken from the immediacy of life.

Trajan's Dacian Wars (from 101 to 102 and from 105 to 107) are narrated in the historical relief, for about two hundred continuous meters without repetition. The expressive style is also new, with a very low relief, so as not to alter the architectural line of the column. It is often highlighted by a contour furrow and rich, expressive variations to effectively render the effect of the different materials (fabrics, hides, trees, armor, melts, rocks, etc.). The artist most likely had to copy a drawn model on the large marble cylinders already in place.

Certainly the relief was made even more expressive by the polychromy and the metal inserts used for the weapons. The reading of the scenes was facilitated by its location in a courtyard between the two loggias of the libraries in Trajan's Forum.

The value to the scenes on the Column is not limited to their technical aspect. The figures in Roman historical reliefs, from the painting in the Esquiline Necropolis to the reliefs of Ara Pacis, are technically impressive, but lack a certain human element that makes them relatable and compassionate. Trajan's Column, on the other hand, is full of narrative values, which make the sacrifice scenes and battles feel full of action and glory. Tragic scenes, such as mass suicides or the deportation of entire families, are represented with drama and pity. The sense of human respect for the beaten enemy is a legacy of Greek culture, which will be found up to the Meditations by Marcus Aurelius about the Sarmatians.

=== Sarcophagi ===
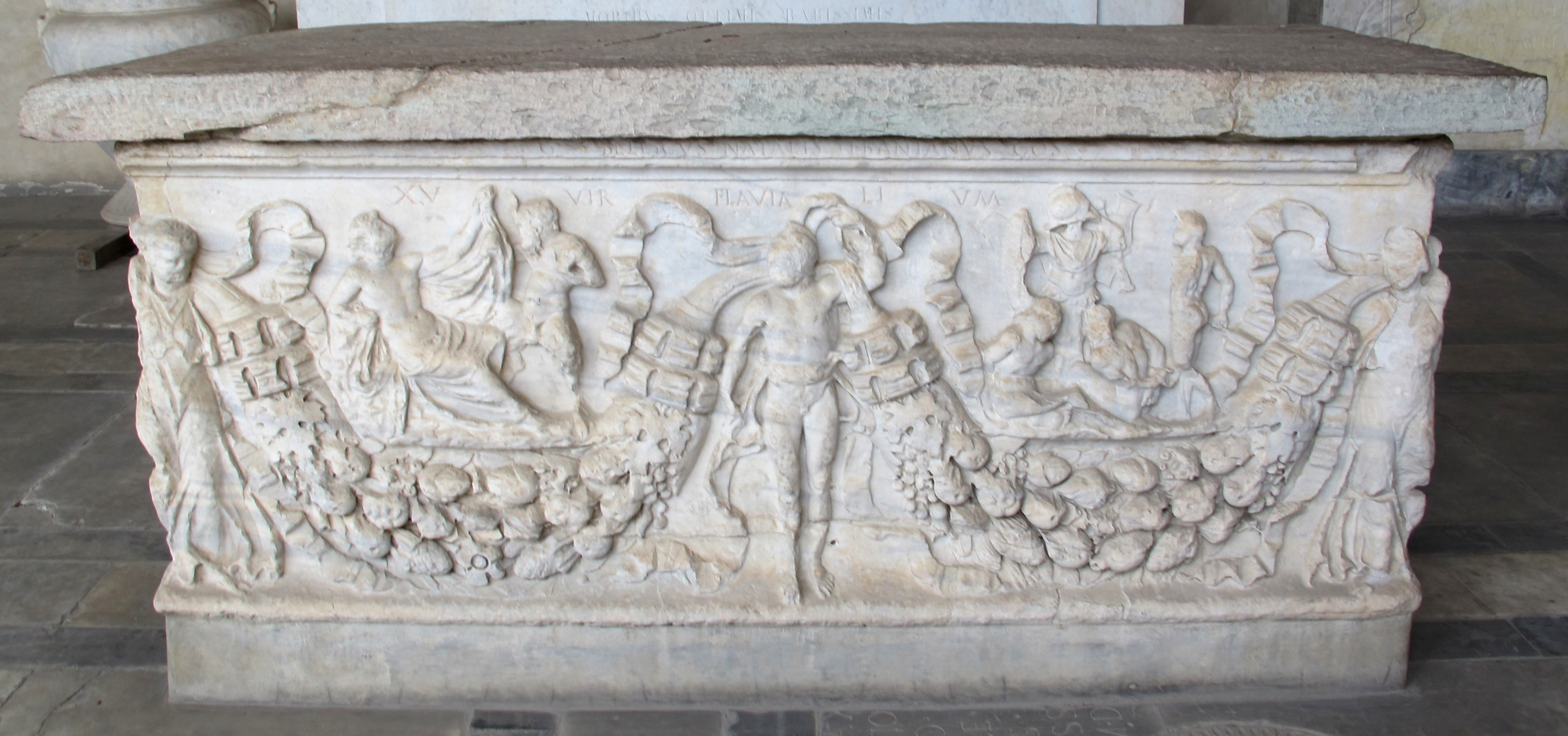
Sarcophagus of Gaius Bellicus Natalis Tebanianus, c. 110

The production of marble sarcophagi adorned with mythological reliefs began in this era. The sarcophagi could be decorated on four or, more often, on three sides, depending on whether they were leaning against a wall (traditionally an Italian placement) or placed in the center of a sepulcher (as was traditional in Asia Minor).

=== Other sculptures ===
Trajan oversaw the installation of many sculptures. This is evident as the coins of the time depict Trajan's Forum rich in statues and reliefs.

In the Arch of Constantine, there is a long frieze from the Trajan era broken into four sections, but originally almost certainly part of a single relief. It is full of vibrant high-relief figures and is closely connected with the art of the Column. The Arch of Trajan at Benevento (from 114) depicts citizens benefiting from the subsidies of the Institutio Alimentaria, a provision taken in 103 by Trajan to provide relief for the needy children of Rome.

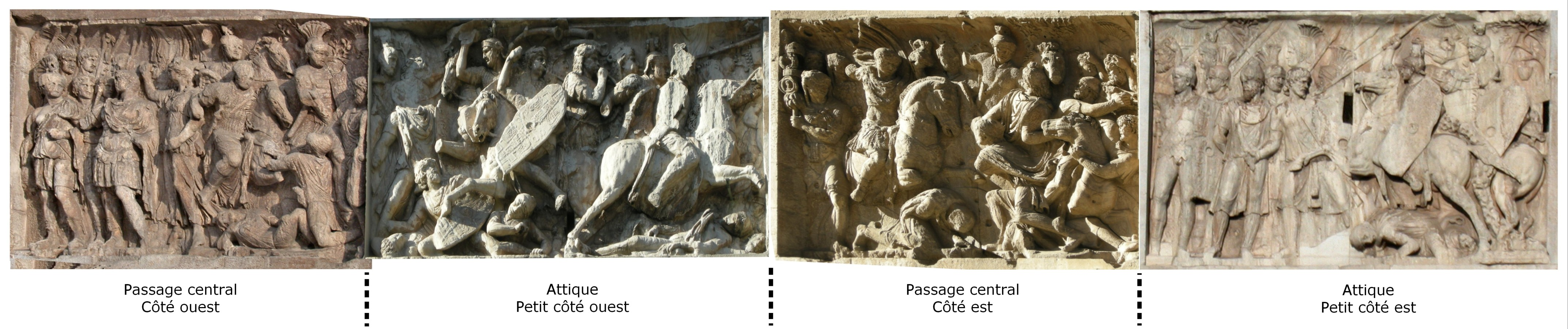
Photographic reconstruction of the Great Frieze of Trajan: the first part, far left: Trajan entering Rome; second part: The prisoners are pressed by a cavalry charge led by the emperor himself and followed by signifers and cornicens; third part: Conquest of a Dacian village by the cavalry and the Roman infantry pushing the prisoners; fourth part, far right: The soldiers show the severed heads of the Dacians. The casts of the sections in their original order are found at the Museum of Roman Civilization.

== Architecture ==
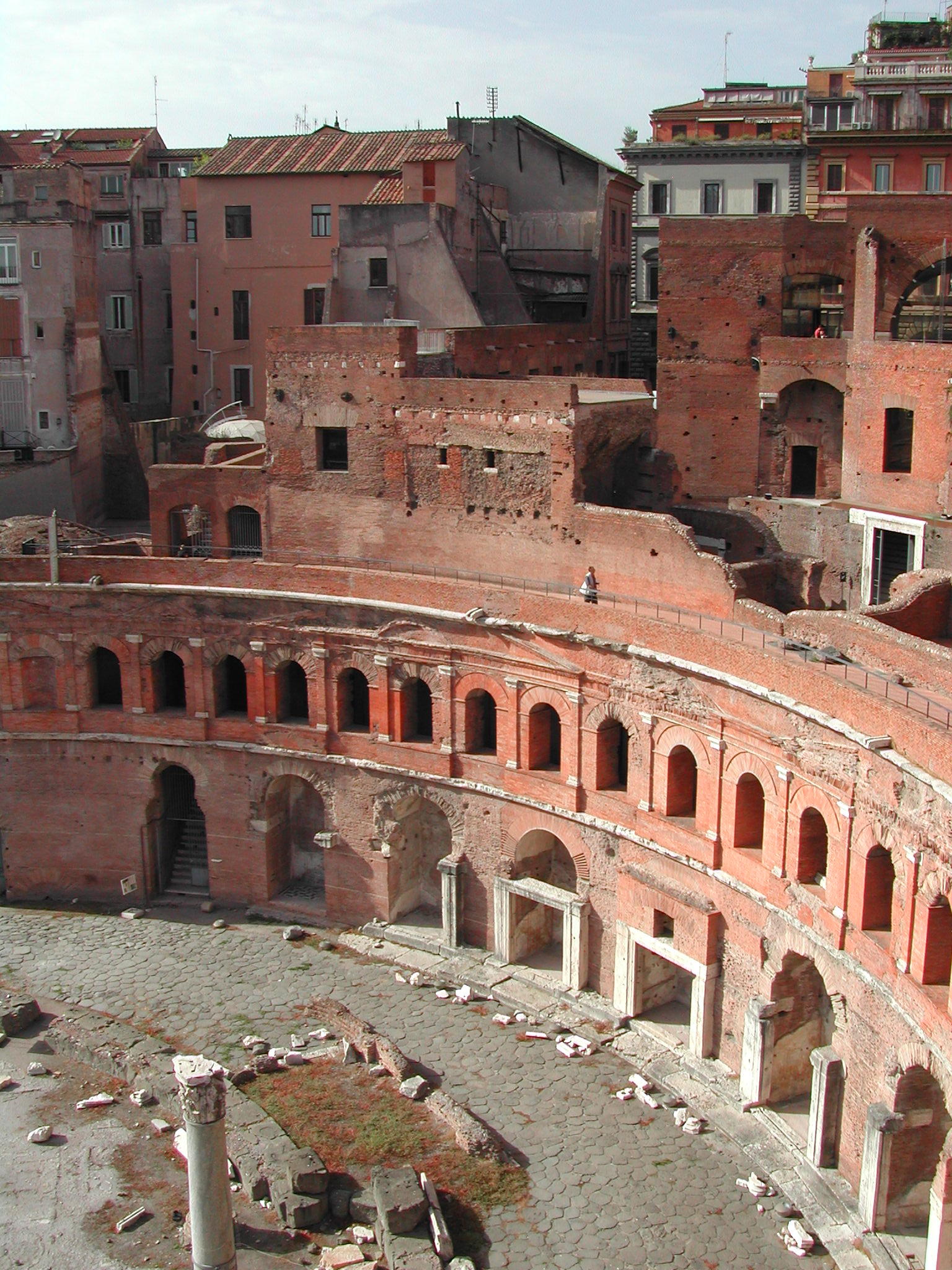
Trajan's Market

Trajan's Forum was the complex that grandly completed the urban planning of the Imperial Fora, to allow the capable administrative, commercial, judicial and political functioning of the capital of the empire. The construction opened up a large public spaces complete with the Basilica Ulpia. The Forum was cut into the Quirinal Hill, and Trajan's Market was constructed to exploit the available space in an articulated way, with several levels and a complex of offices and administrative spaces.

Noteworthy was the production of arches, such as the aforementioned arch of Benevento, one celebrating the opening of the Via Traiana in 114, and the Arch of Trajan of Ancona in 115.

== Painting ==
In Rome and in the other Italian cities, the presence of paintings from this period is very scarce. The best examples of pictorial decorations found in the Empire that date back to the time of Trajan are found in Vienne, Magdalensberg, Aquileia, Carnuntum, Aquincum, Sabaria, and Scarbantia. This indicates that the provinces were flourishing during this time as well.

== Provincial art ==
In the last years of Trajan's reign (114 - 116), the Philopappos Monument was erected in Athens on the top of the hill in front of the Acropolis. The architecture is inspired by Syrian, Commagene, and Lycian works, with Greek influenced moldings and a frieze that shows a relationship with the historical reliefs in Rome. This demonstrates the unity and mutual cultural exchange now active between Rome and the provinces, even the most advanced ones.

In Dacia, infrastructure was built during the military campaigns, among which remains Trajan's Bridge over the Danube. This is the longest masonry bridge ever built. A large memorial was also erected for the fallen in the wars and the celebration of the final victory. This was the Tropaeum Traiani in the Romanian town of Adamclisi. It is circular, according to the Roman funeral model. The reliefs on the metopes of the frieze and the battlements are particularly interesting because they demonstrate that local workers used iconographic models from Rome.

== Bibliography ==
- (in Italian) Ranuccio Bianchi Bandinelli & Mario Torelli, L'arte dell'antichità classica, Etruria-Roma, Utet, Torino 1976.
- (in Italian) Pierluigi De Vecchi & Elda Cerchiari, I tempi dell'arte, volume 1, Bompiani, Milano 1999
