= Tadia gens =

Ancient Roman family

The gens Tadia was a minor plebeian family at ancient Rome. Members of this gens are first mentioned in the time of Cicero, but few achieved any great distinction in the Roman state.

== Origin ==
The nomen Tadius seems to be of Sabine origin. Some of the Tadii known from inscriptions came from Sabinum, and Chase classifies the name among those gentilicia that were evidently not Latin, but came from Sabinum, Umbria, or other parts of central and southern Italy.

== Praenomina ==
The Tadii seem to have used a variety of common praenomina, including Publius, Quintus, Titus, Sextus, and Marcus. One inscription shows that they also used the Sabine praenomen Attius.

== Members ==
This list includes abbreviated praenomina. For an explanation of this practice, see filiation.

- Titus Tadius At. f. Drusus, buried at Amiternum in Sabinum, along with his wife, Rutilia Rufa.
- Tadius, sought the advice of Titus Pomponius Atticus with regard to some property that he held. The property was legally owned by an unmarried girl, for whom a guardian had been appointed; but Atticus informed Tadius that the property was his by virtue of prescription. Cicero wrote to remind Atticus that no right of usucaption could exist in the case of such a ward, and was relieved to hear back that Atticus had settled the matter out of court, to Tadius' satisfaction.
- Publius Tadius, a negotiator, or money-lender, at Athens, who was employed as an agent of Verres in Sicily. Cicero contrasts his integrity with the low character of his employer. He may have been the brother of Quintus Tadius, whom Verres also employed.
- Quintus Tadius, a maternal relative of Verres, who gave evidence of the latter's unabashed avarice, both through his testimony and his account-books, which Cicero planned to present in his second action against Verres. As Verres abandoned his defense and fled into exile, the speech was never delivered.
- Publius Tadius Chilo, one of the first duumvirs at Caesar's colony at Corinth, together with Gaius Julius Nicephorus. He may have been the son, or perhaps less likely the freedman, of the negotiator Publius Tadius, who lived at Athens.
- Tadius M. f. Rufus, named in an inscription from a building in Hispania.
- Spurius Tadius, a painter of landscape murals during the time of Augustus. The reading of his name is uncertain; it may instead be Studius, or even Ludius.
- Sextus Tadius Sex. f. Lusius Nepos Paullinus, in a long and productive career under the Flavians or the Antonines, was decemvir stlitibus judicandis, a military tribune in the Legio IV Flavia Felix, quaestor in Bithynia and Pontus, curule aedile, governor of Macedonia and Asia, praefectus frumenti dandi, (Note: The prefect in charge of distributing the grain dole.), and proconsul of Africa and Crete and Cyrenaica. His wife was Mulvia Placida, and they were buried at Trebula Mutusca in Sabinum.

== See also ==
- List of Roman gentes

== Bibliography ==
- Marcus Tullius Cicero, Epistulae ad Atticum, In Verrem.
- Dictionary of Greek and Roman Biography and Mythology, William Smith, ed., Little, Brown and Company, Boston (1849).
- Theodor Mommsen et alii, Corpus Inscriptionum Latinarum (The Body of Latin Inscriptions, abbreviated CIL), Berlin-Brandenburgische Akademie der Wissenschaften (1853–present).
- August Pauly, Georg Wissowa, et alii, Realencyclopädie der Classischen Altertumswissenschaft (Scientific Encyclopedia of the Knowledge of Classical Antiquities, abbreviated or PW), J. B. Metzler, Stuttgart (1894–1980).
- George Davis Chase, "The Origin of Roman Praenomina", in Harvard Studies in Classical Philology, vol. VIII, pp. 103–184 (1897).
- Paul von Rohden, Elimar Klebs, & Hermann Dessau, Prosopographia Imperii Romani (The Prosopography of the Roman Empire, abbreviated PIR), Berlin (1898).
