= Flavian art =

Roman Empire artistic production

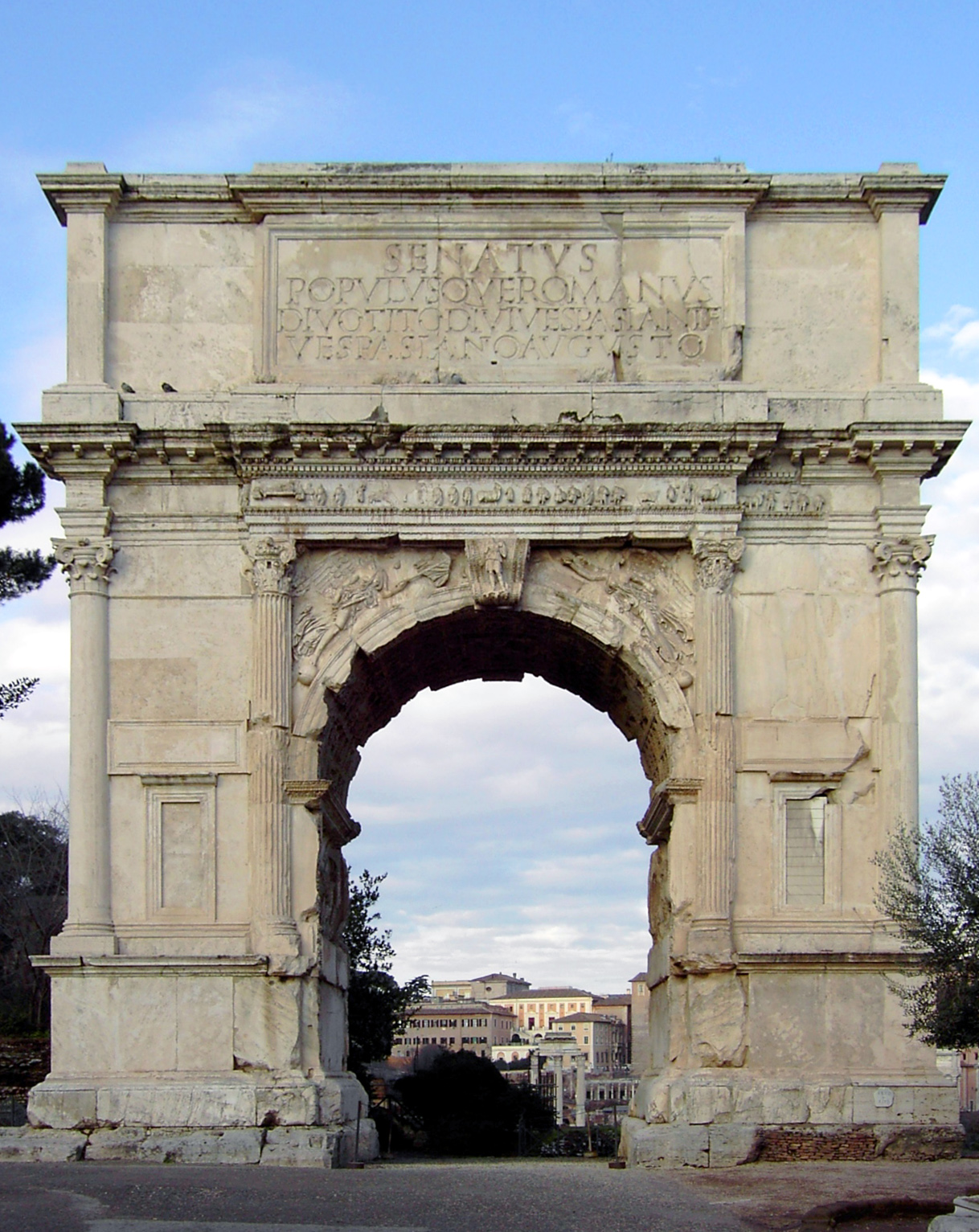
The Arch of Titus

Flavian art is the artistic production of the Roman Empire during the Flavian dynasty (emperors Vespasian, Titus, and Domitian) from 69 to 96 AD.

Already at the time of Claudius and Nero, the style of sculpture began to separate itself from the neo-Attic Athenian art that dominated the late Republic. This style was almost definitively abandoned under the Flavian dynasty. It is not fully known what the catalyst for this change was.

Two major trends emerged in sculpture: the use of a more nuanced chiaroscuro in the bas-relief, and the use of placing the figures in a three-dimensional space with regard to the perspective of the viewer.

== Arch of Titus ==
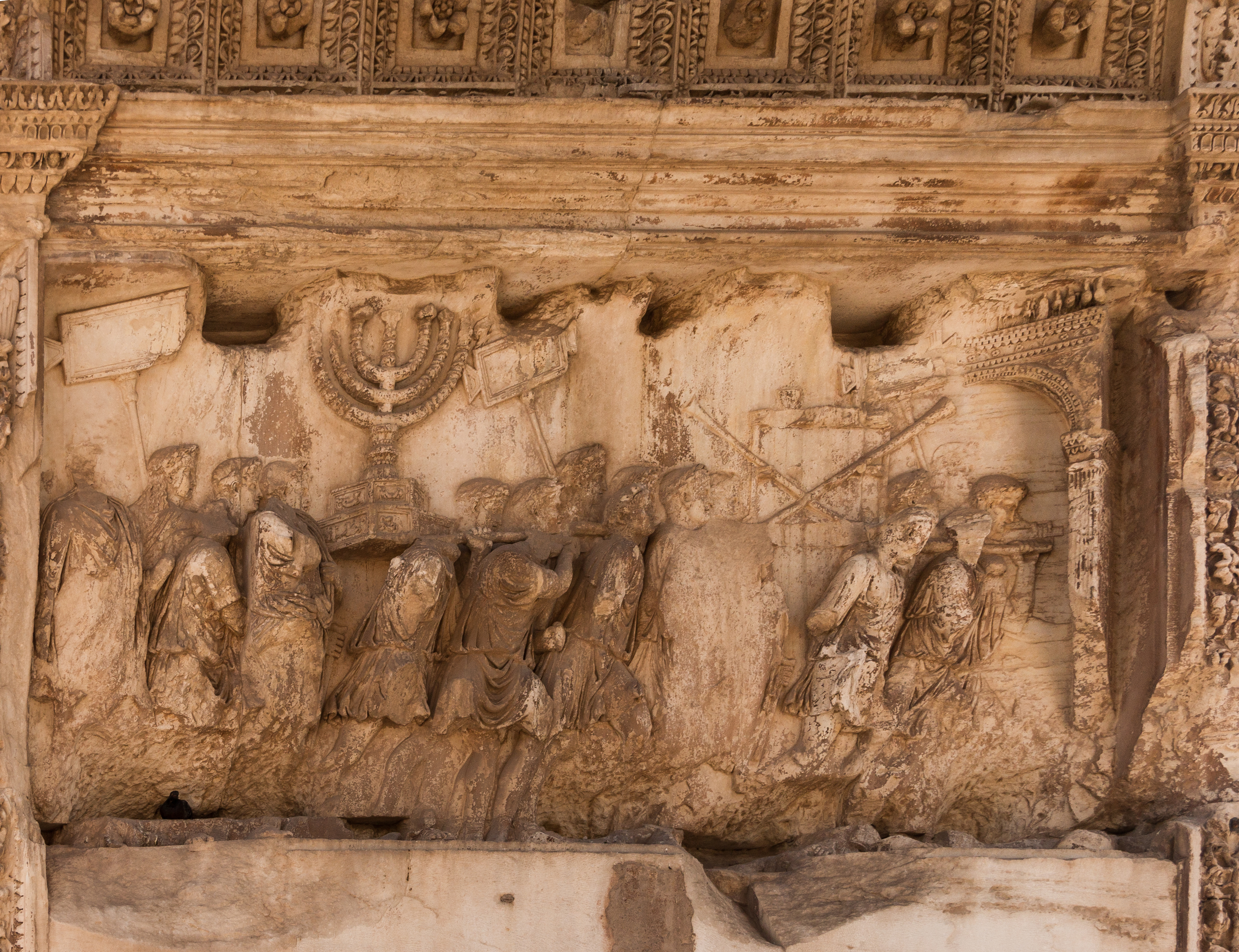
Relief of the procession on the Arch of Titus

The greatest symbol of the Flavian era is the Arch of Titus, dated between 81 and 90. The architecture is denser and heavier than the arches of the Augustan era, such as the Arch of Susa. This is a clear deviation from the traditional Hellenistic influence. Here for the first time in Rome the Ionic/Corinthian Composite order appears, a more ornamental style. The numerous internal reliefs of the archway are extraordinarily significant and show two moments of the triumphal procession which took place in 71 after the capture of Jerusalem by Titus.

In these pieces, we see the innovation of Roman relief. Evident are the thickened figures, with the height of the figures consistent with their location in space. Individual figures are represented as if they were moving within three dimensions. Furthermore, the figures do not move on a straight line, but on a convex curved line, clearly visible in the relief of the procession. On the left it appears the figures are moving towards the viewer, and on the far right, moving away as they enter under the Porta Triumphalis. This trend continued to be developed further during the Nerva–Antonine dynasty.

== Other sculptures ==
This era saw the commission of the Cancelleria Reliefs likely by Domitian, constructed around 90. These are imbued with classicism found in the era of Claudius, but also display the arrangement of the figures along a convex line.

== Architecture ==
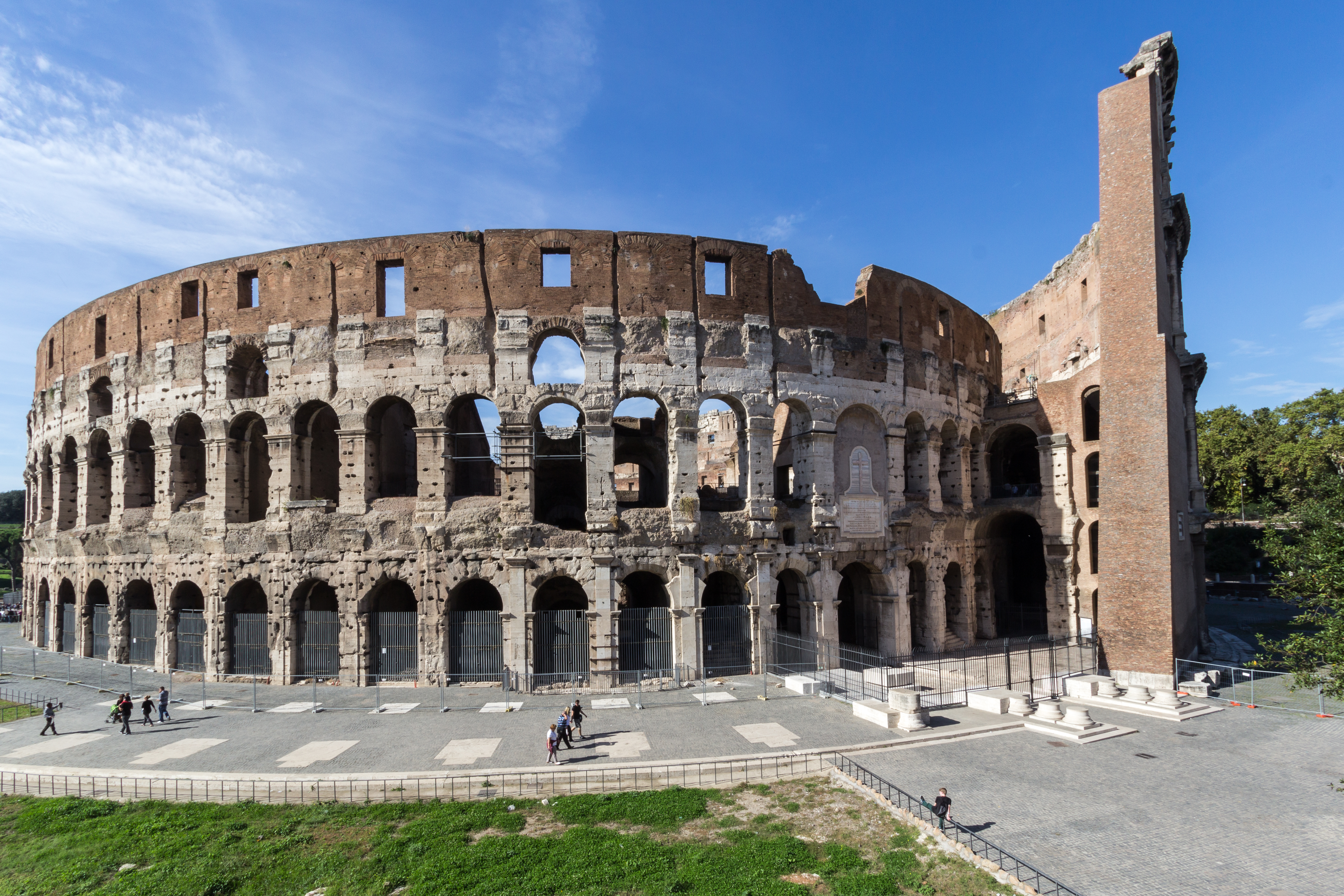
The Colosseum, constructed between 70 and 80

The Great Fire of Rome in 64 destroyed much of the city, making it necessary to rebuild. New squares were opened, the streets became wider and lined with arcades, and houses were constructed to a more limited height. Domitian rebuilt the burnt monuments at the Campus Martius, plus the Piazza Navona and the Odeon of Domitian.

The Flavian dynasty, in particular under Domitian, oversaw the monumentalization of the Palatine Hill. The emperors Augustus, Tiberius, Caligula, and Nero all had residences on the hill, but the most grandiose palace was built by Domitian. The Palace of Domitian, constructed by the architect Rabirius, had at least three parts; the Domus Flavia, the Domus Augustana, and the gardens.

Architectural development in the Flavian era was of fundamental importance for the implementation of new techniques. This period saw an increase in the use of the hemispherical domes (Domus Transitoria, the nymphaeum at the Villa of Domitian), the development of rib vaults (the Colosseum), the use of ogives with brick arches in series, and the development of barrel vaults, which reach 33 meters in diameter in the Domitian vestibule of the Roman Forum.

== Bibliography ==
- (in Italian) Ranuccio Bianchi Bandinelli & Mario Torelli, L'arte dell'antichità classica, Etruria-Roma, Utet, Torino 1976.
- (in Italian) Pierluigi De Vecchi & Elda Cerchiari, I tempi dell'arte, volume 1, Bompiani, Milano 1999
