= Funerary Monument of Lusius Storax =

Sculpture on a tomb in early Rome (1st century CE)

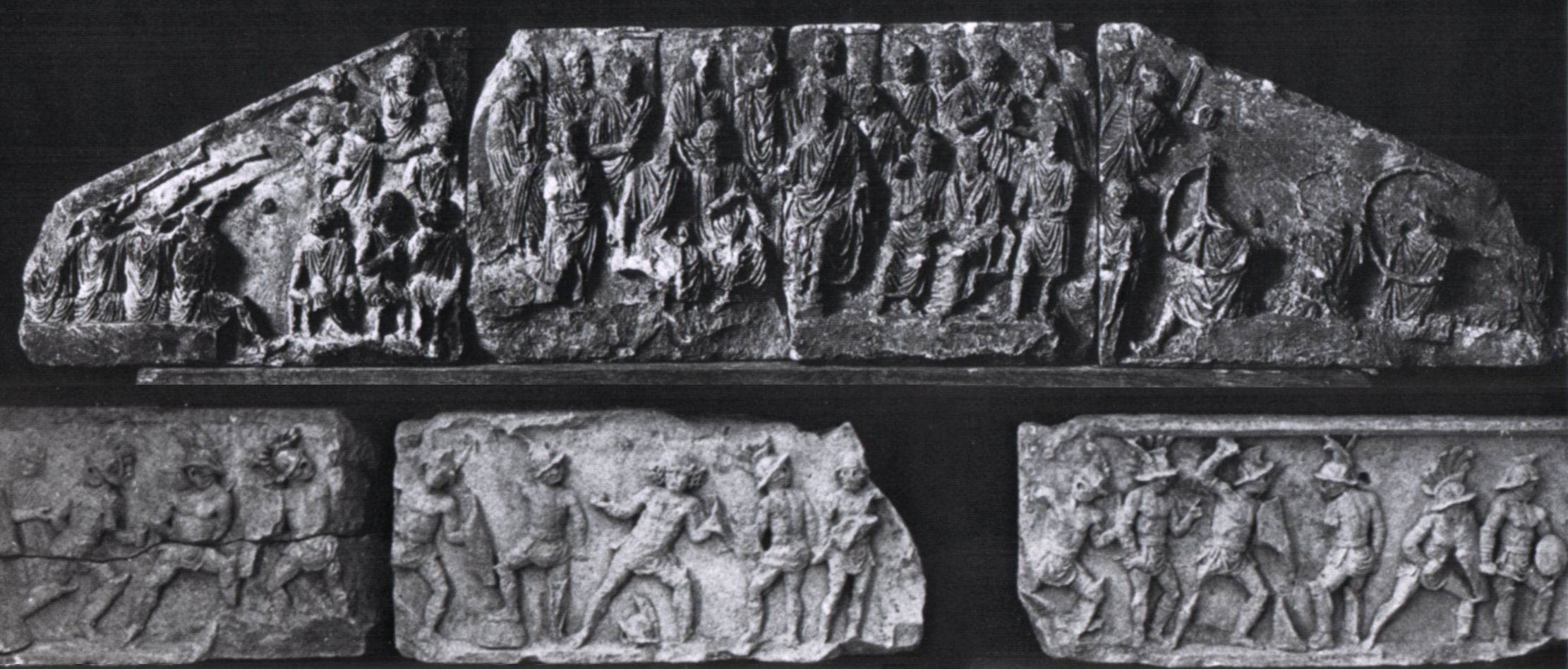

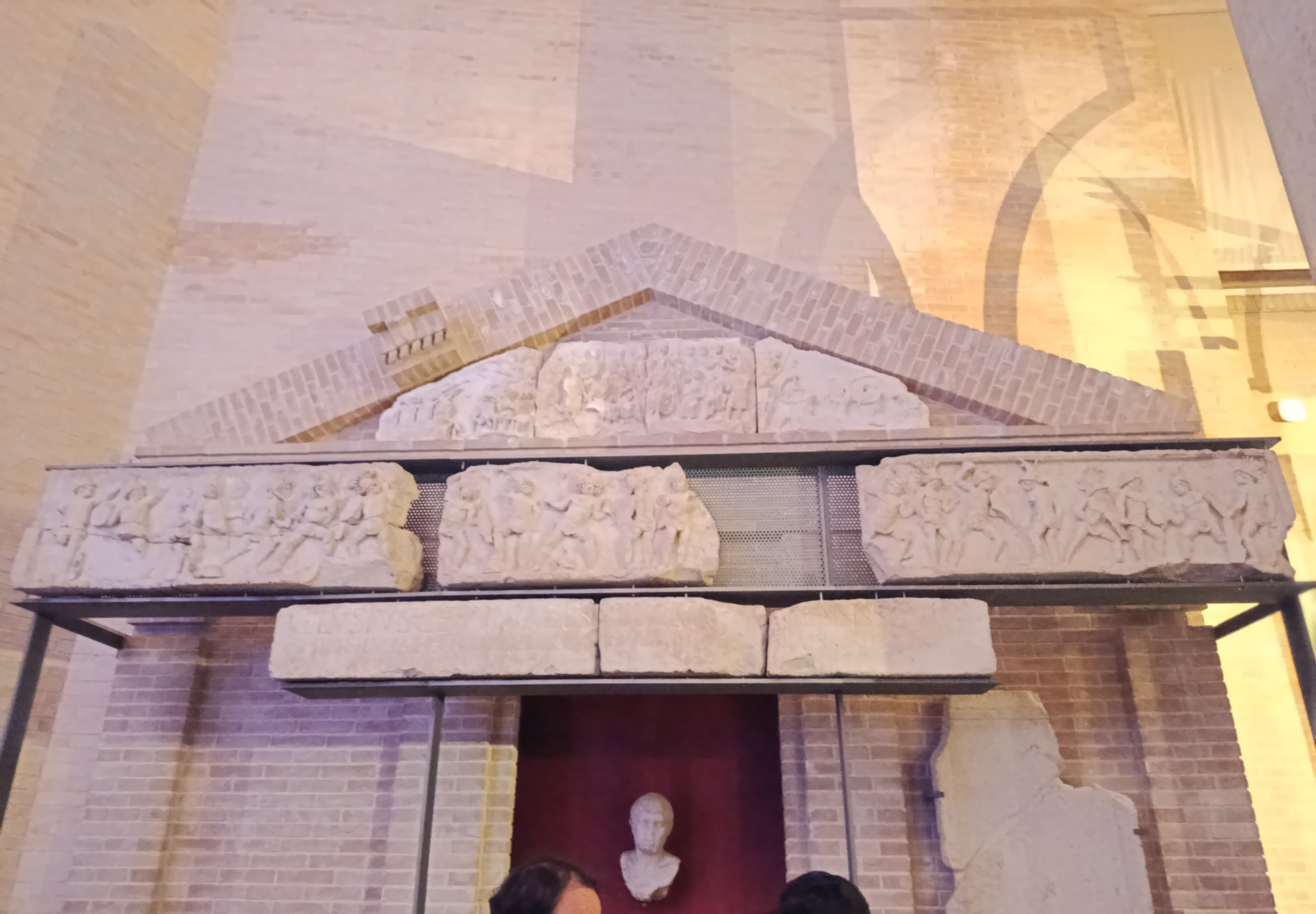
- Material: marble
- Created: c. AD 30–50
- Present location: Archaeological Museum La Civitella, Chieti

The Funerary Monument of Lusius Storax is a temple tomb of the early Roman Imperial period, preserved in the Archaeological Museum La Civitella in Chieti. The monument consists of two reliefs, a frieze and a pediment, which are dated between AD 30 and 50 on epigraphic and stylistic grounds (like the type of armour worn by the gladiators). The tomb's occupant, Gaius Lusius Storax, was a freedman who became a sevir Augustalis of Teate (modern Chieti) following the administrative reforms of Augustus.

== Frieze ==
The frieze depicts a gladiatorial game, which the rich Lucius must have organised on the occasion of his election. The gladiators are depicted in various poses (saluting, preparing, fighting, victorious, and defeated), as if part of a single scene, although in reality the various stages would actually happen sequentially. The goal of the donor must have been to document the sumptuousness of the games, whose cost was proportional to the number of combatants involved. The relief is composed with a careful equilibrium and rhythmic pattern of movement. The background is neutral and the details of the figures are developed with care, especially the musculature and drapery. The style has been thought to be inspired directly by models from the city of Rome.

== Pediment ==
The scene on the pediment is more crowded and seems to depicted a single, real event, namely the investiture of Lusius Storax as sevir Augustalis. There are two levels, one on top of the other. At the sides are two groups of musicians: cornicines at right and tubicines at left. At lower left on the first level, there is a seat with three young men, likely three camilli who symbolise the sacrifices connected with the investiture ceremony. The centre is occupied by the tribunal, with Storax at the centre and two bisellia (seats for honoured Romans) at his sides, in which the Quadrumvirs of Teate sit, flanked by a standing lictor. A man with a stick (an augur or a lanista) stands at right, balancing the three camilli.

The upper level of the pediment has a colonnade in the background, probably the forum of Teate (site of the games depicted on the frieze). Eleven togate men stand on this level, who are the college of seviri Augustales, six leaving office at the end of their term and five entering office (the sixth being Storax), as well as a lictor. One of the seviri bends to say something in Storax's ear. Two of them stand at right counting the money in a box, symbolising the payment of the summa honoraria by Storax, although this scrutiny would not actually have taken place during the games.

At the far left of the upper level, there is a compressed scene of a woman with arms wide open and a man punching another man in the face. This might be a depiction of a small brawl which occurred during the games, similar to the riot of the Pompeians and the Nucerians in AD 59.

== Plebeian art ==
The work is an interesting document of a strand of less refined and non-official Roman art, which Ranuccio Bianchi Bandinelli termed 'Plebeian art', which gradually became the main style of art used by the Roman state over the course of the first three centuries AD. Key features are the depiction of a series of events as part of a single scene, the use of a squashed perspective, the larger size of key individuals, the depiction of games in a lower register. These recur in 4th century imperial artworks like the Arch of Constantine and the pedestal of the Obelisk of Theodosius.

== Bibliography ==
- Ranuccio Bianchi Bandinelli & Mario Torelli, L'arte dell'antichità classica, Etruria-Roma, Torino, Utet, 1976.
