= Cəmilli =

Cəmilli or Cemilli or Dzhamily or Dzhamilli or Dzhamillu may refer to:

- Cəmilli, Kalbajar, Azerbaijan
- Cəmilli, Khojali, Azerbaijan
- Cəmilli, Tartar, Azerbaijan
- Cemilli, Mersin, Turkey
