= Proclus (mosaicist) =

Artist in the time of Augustus

Proclus or Proklos (Greek: Πρόκλος) is the name of one of the eminent artists in mosaic who flourished in the Augustan Age. He was revered for his work on the Tychaeum at Perinthus.

His name occurs on two inscriptions found at Perinthus. From one of these we learn that he adorned the temple of Fortuna in that city, and that the Alexandrian merchants who frequented the city erected a statue in honour of him.

The second inscription is the epitaph of a mosaic artist, who is said in it to have left a son, his associate and equal in the art; from which it would seem probable that both father and son were named Proclus. The second inscription, as restored, runs thus:

πάσαις ἐν πολίεσσι τέχνην ἤσκησα πρὸ πάντων
ψηφοδέτας, δώροις Παλλάδος εὑράμενος,
υἷα λιπὼν βουλῆς σύνεδρον Πρόκλον ἰσότεχνὸν μοι
ὀγδωκοντούτης τοῦδε τάφοιο λαχών.
