= Gonzalo Camilli =

Uruguayan footballer (born 1974)

Personal information
- Full name: Gonzalo Martín Camilli Toricez
- Date of birth: 4 June 1974 (age 52)
- Place of birth: Montevideo, Uruguay
- Position: Forward

Youth career
- Independiente

Senior career*
Years	Team	Apps	(Gls)
1992–1997	Independiente	5	(1)
1995	→ Atlético Tucumán (loan)	6	(1)
1997	Santiago Wanderers	2	(0)
1998	Montevideo Wanderers	5	(0)
1999	Águila		
2000	Técnico Universitario		
2001	Deportivo Saquisilí	15	(10)
2004	Argentino de Quilmes		
- * Club domestic league appearances and goals

Gonzalo Martín Camilli Toricez (born June 4, 1974, in Montevideo, Uruguay) is a former Uruguayan footballer who played for clubs of Uruguay, Argentina, Chile, Ecuador and El Salvador.

== Teams ==
- (Argentina) Independiente 1992–1995
- (Argentina) Atlético Tucumán 1995
- (Argentina) Independiente 1996–1997
- (Chile) Santiago Wanderers 1997
- (Uruguay) Montevideo Wanderers 1998
- (El Salvador) Águila 1999
- (Ecuador) Técnico Universitario 2000
- (Ecuador) Deportivo Saquisili 2001
- (Argentina) Argentino de Quilmes 2004

== Post-retirement ==
Camilli has worked as a football coach for children in Argentina.
