= Spurius Tadius =

Roman muralist

Spurius Tadius, also Ludius or Studius, was a Roman muralist of the Augustan period. His exact date of birth and death are unknown. Some manuscripts refer to him by alternate names, including Studius and Ludius.

Tadius painted landscape murals during the reign of Augustus. He was noted for his scenes of villas and ports. According to Pliny the Elder's Natural History, he introduced this genre of painting to Rome; many frescoes consistent with his style have been found in Roman villas of the period, although none have been credited to him.

== Bibliography ==
- Grove Dictionary of Art Online (2000-2002), "Rome, ancient: V. Painters:iii. Painters and Society"
- Martin Robertson, History of Greek Art (1975), p. 611
