= List of ancient sites in Rome =

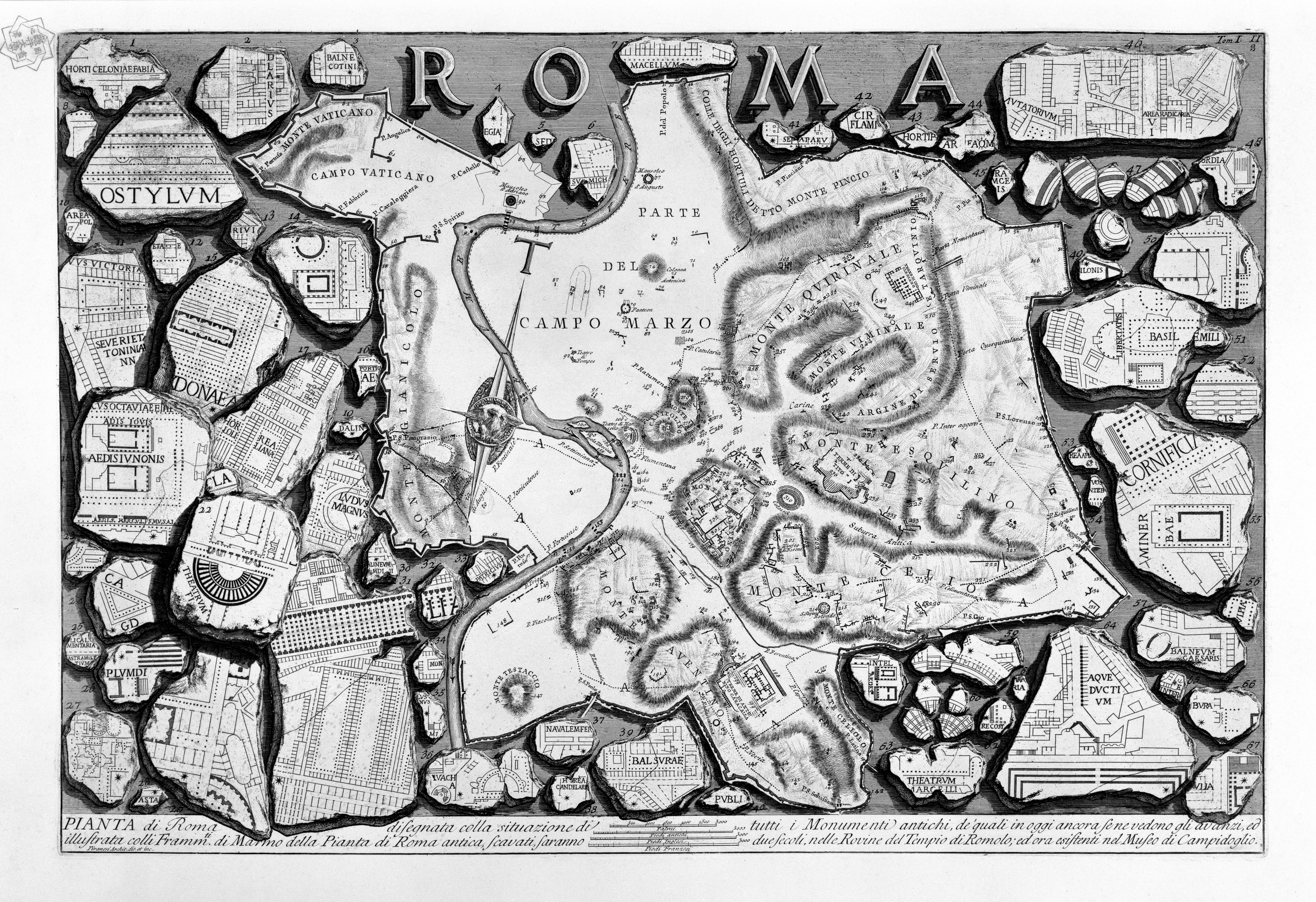
Map of ancient Rome based on the Forma Urbis Romae in Le antichità Romane, by Giovanni Battista Piranesi.

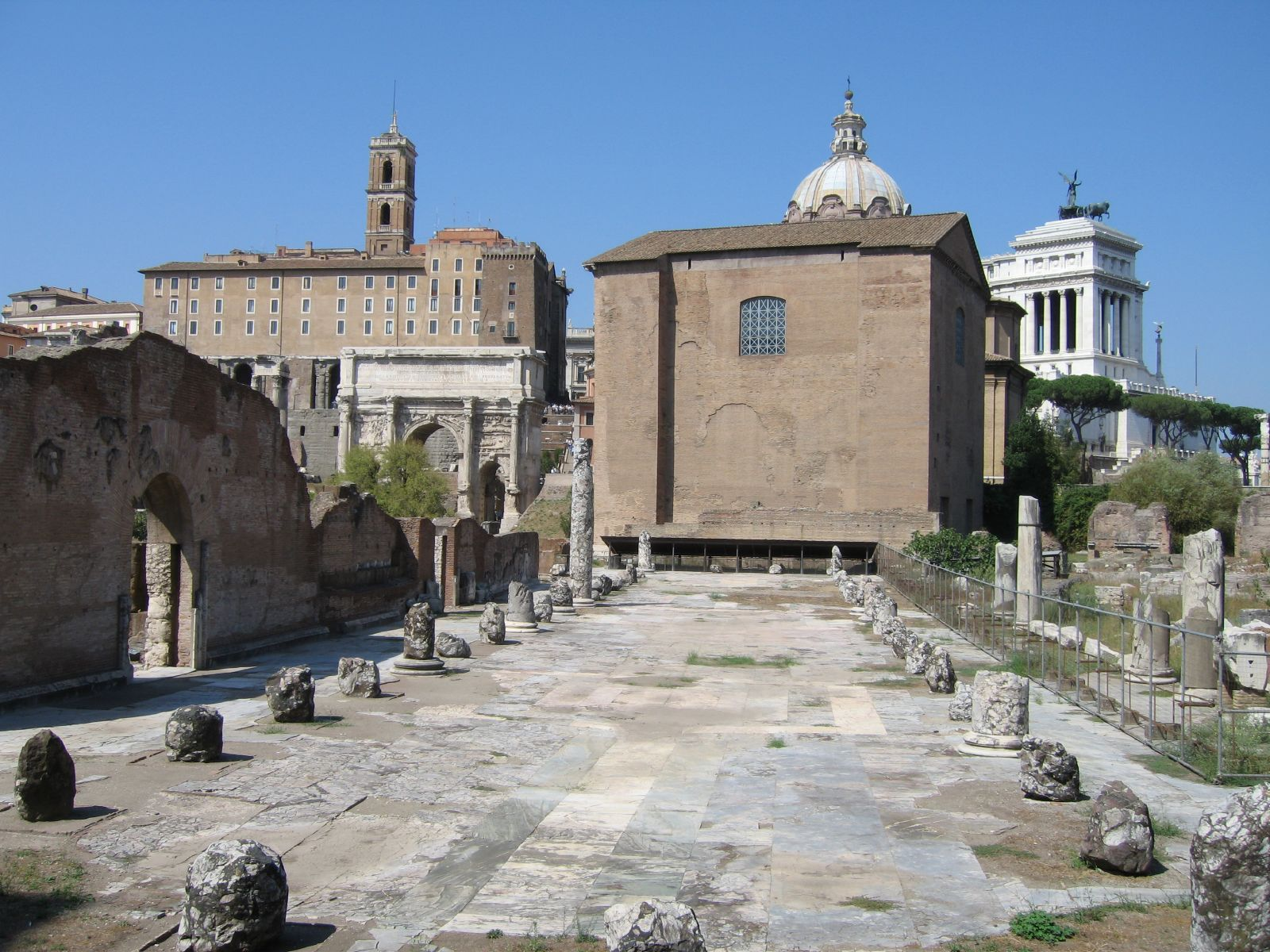
Curia Julia (background) and the Basilica Aemilia (foreground)

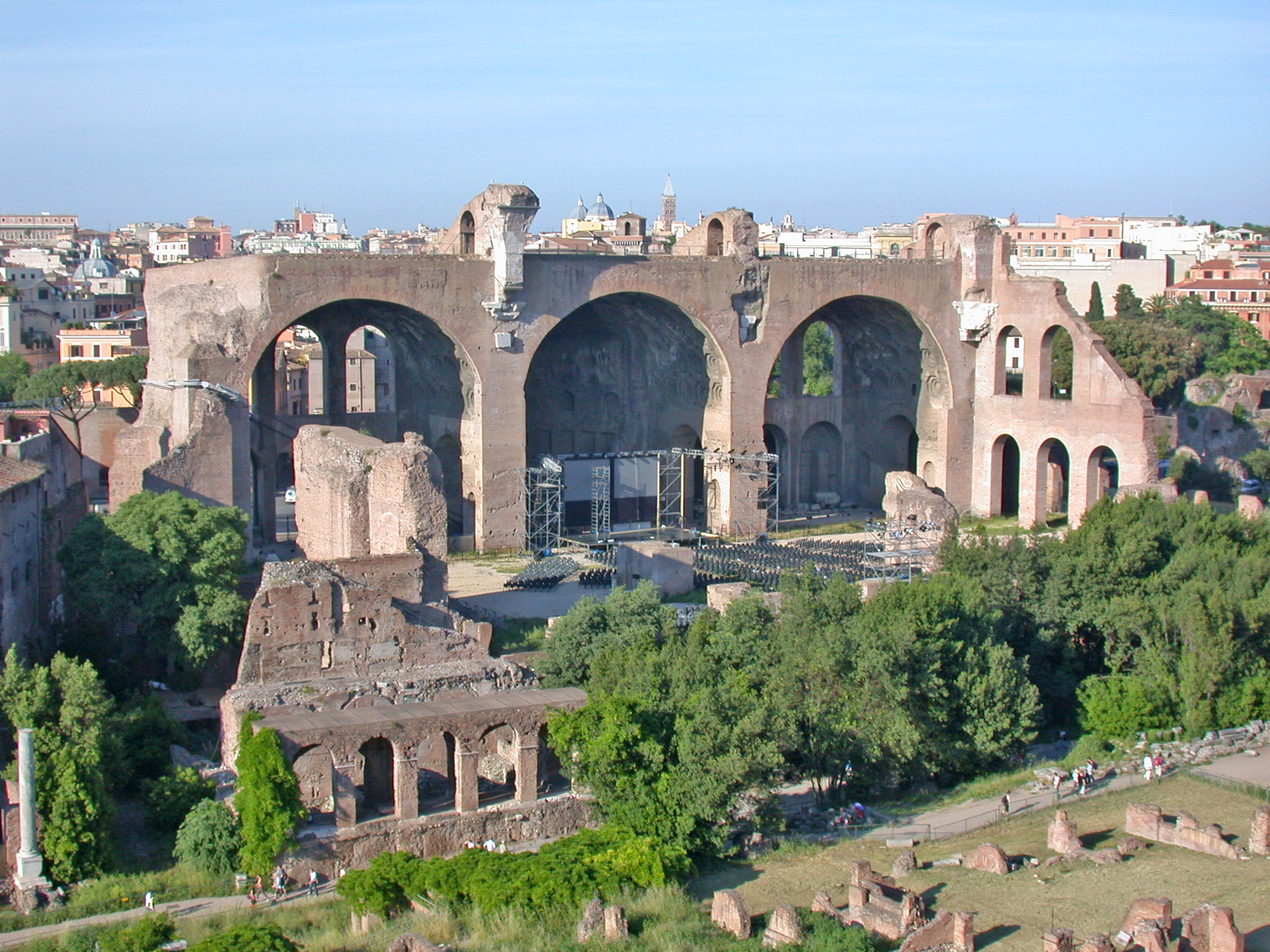
Basilica of Maxentius

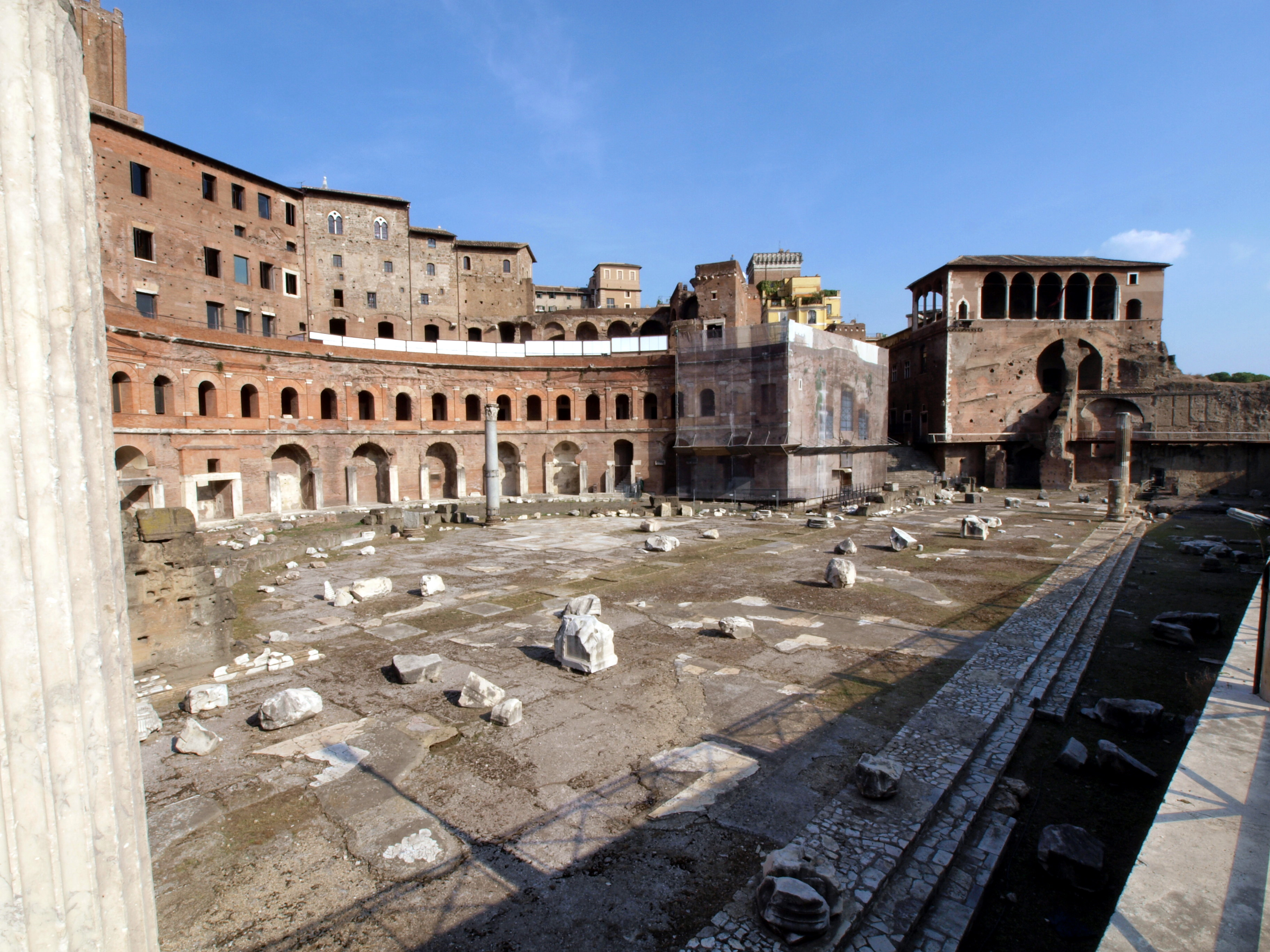
Forum of Trajan and Markets of Trajan

Colosseum

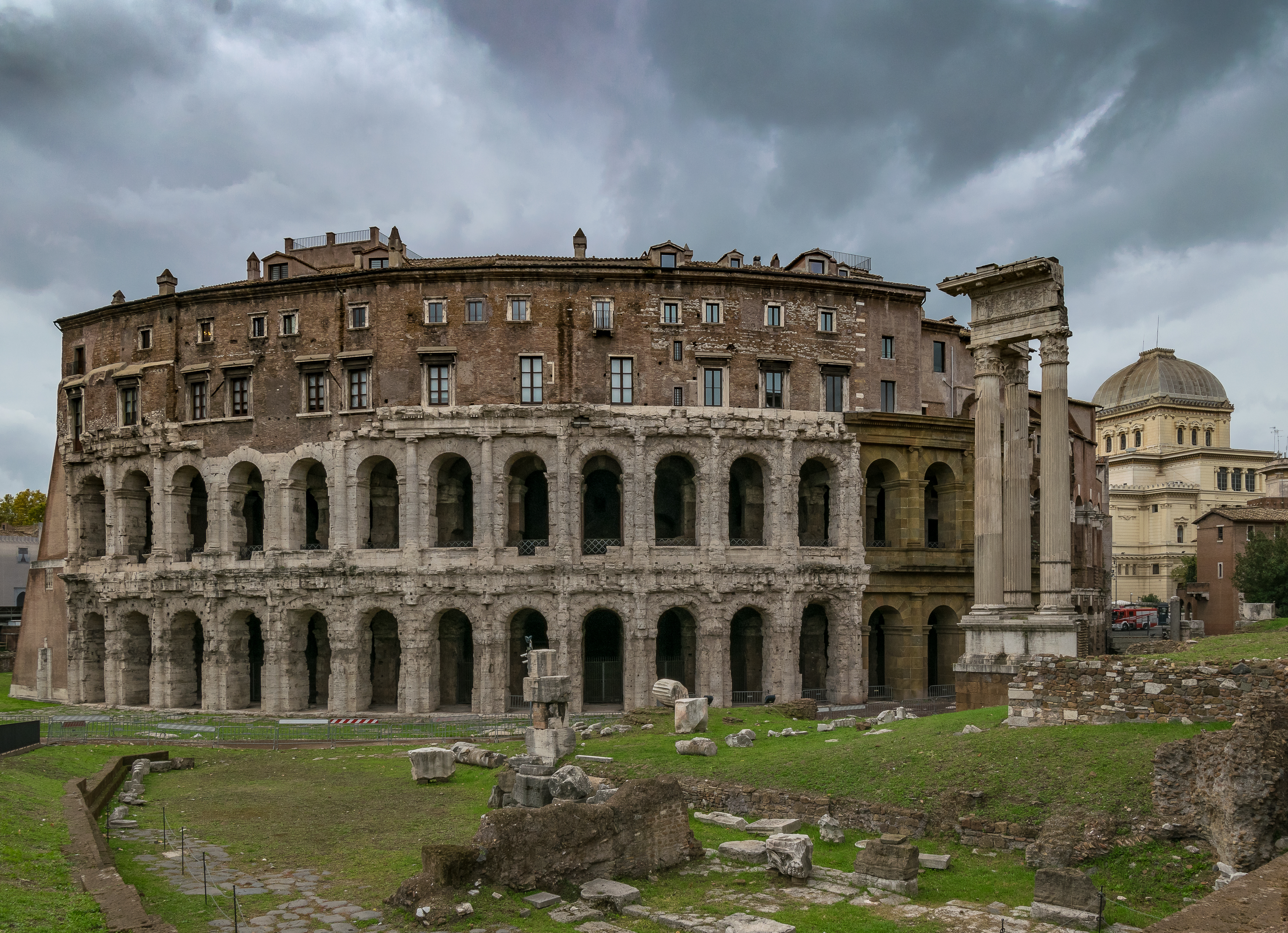
Theater of Marcellus and the Temple of Apollo Sosianus

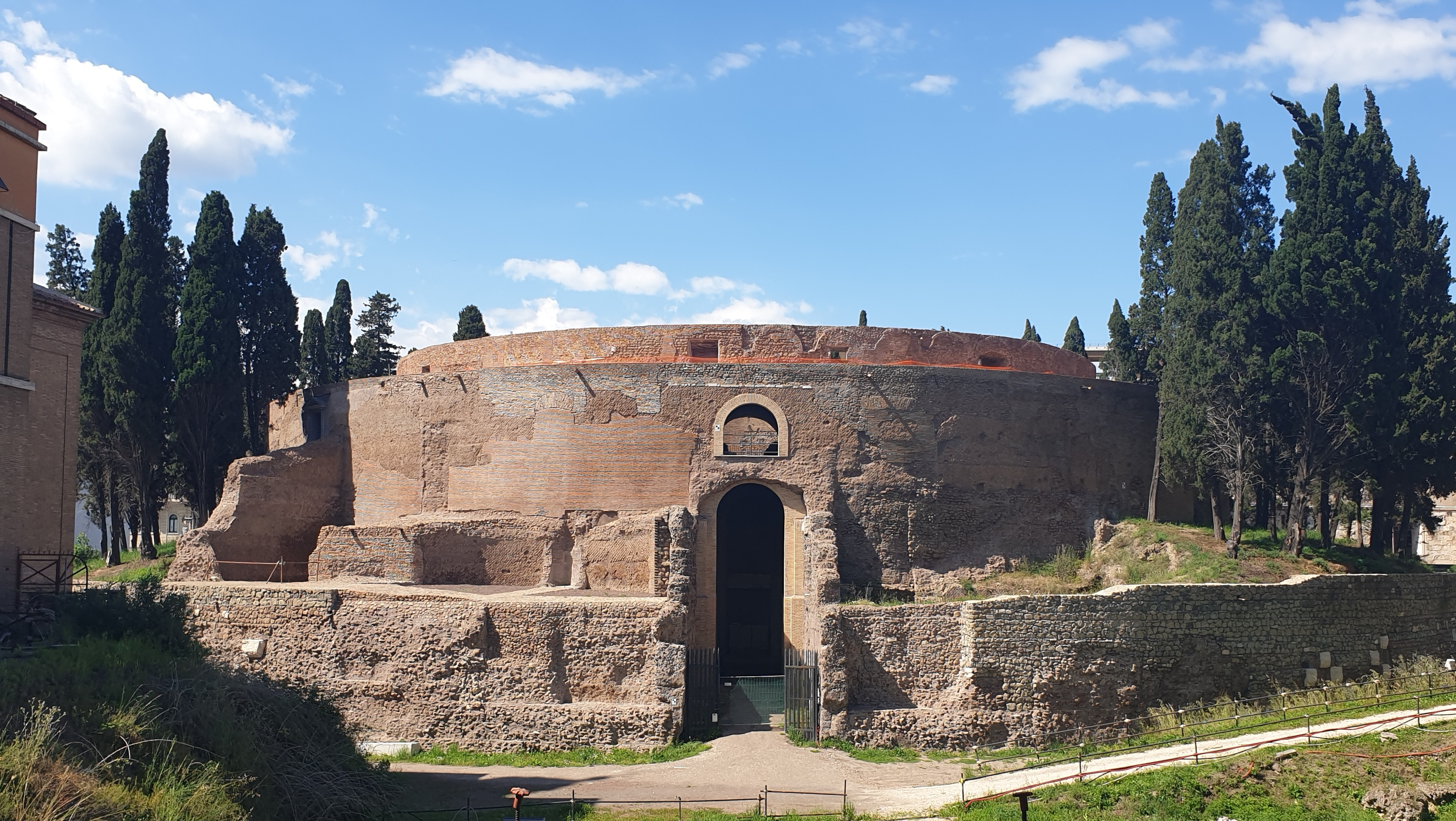
Mausoleum of Augustus

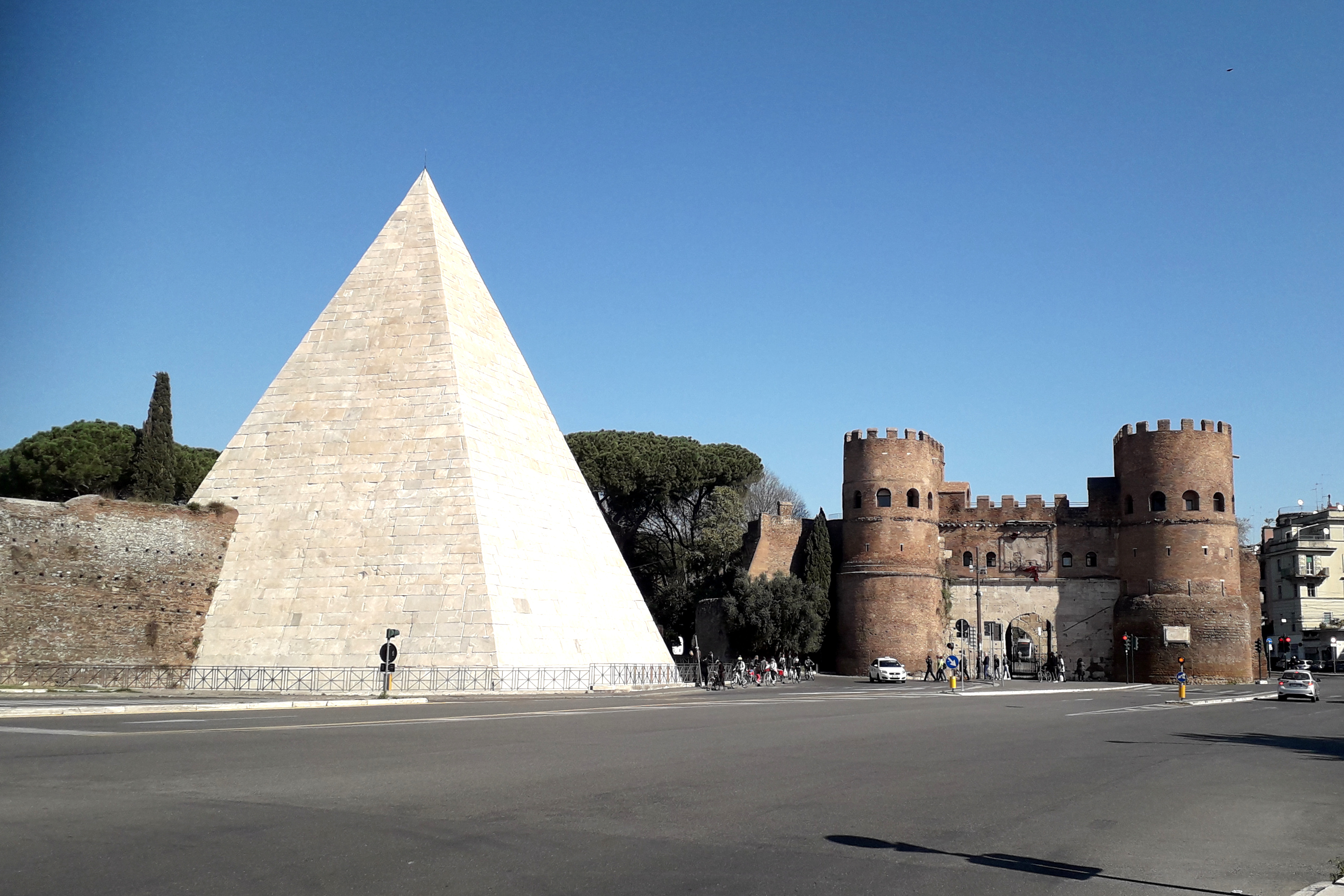
Pyramid of Cestius and the Porta San Paolo

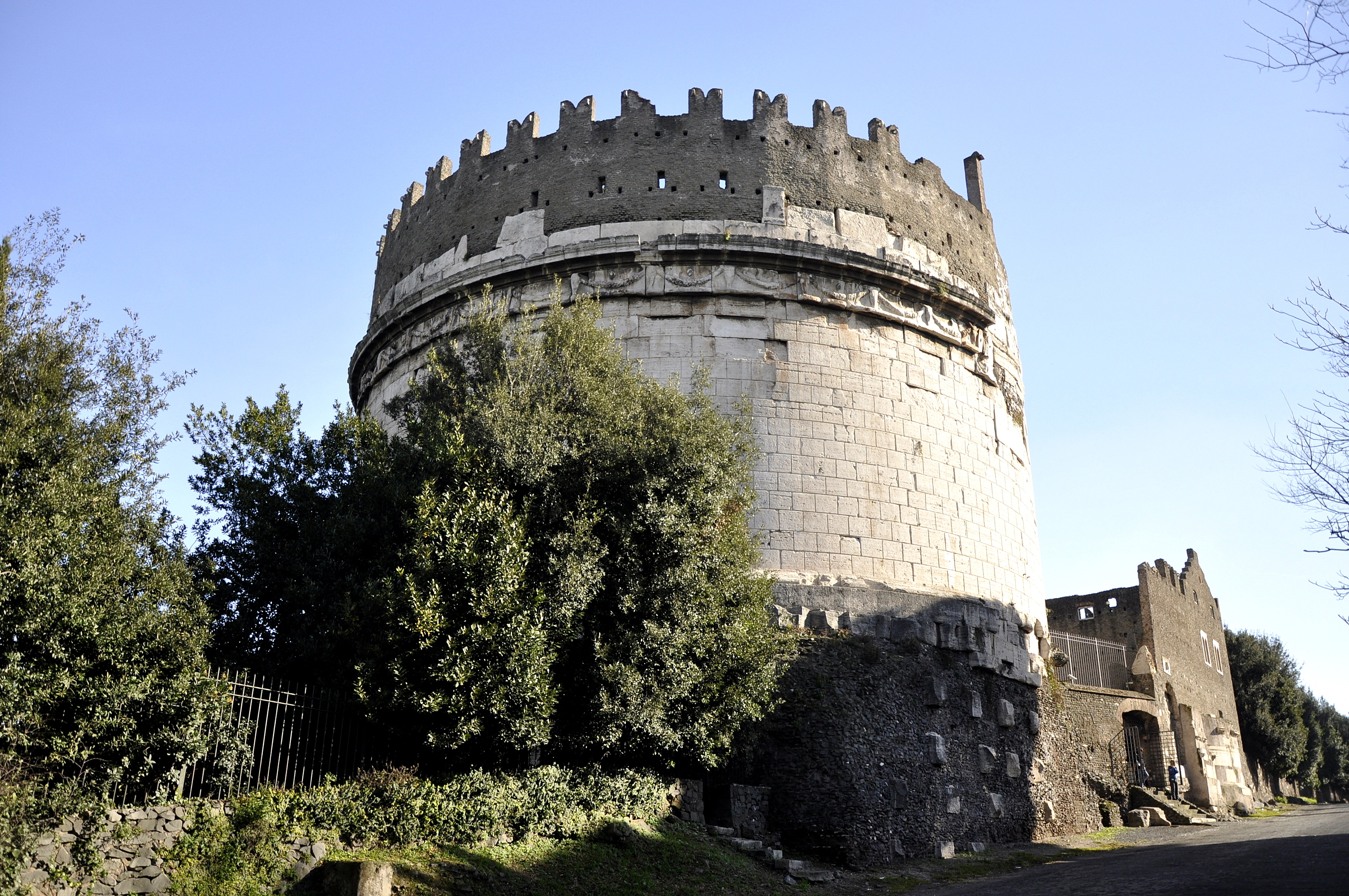
Mausoleum of Cecilia Metella

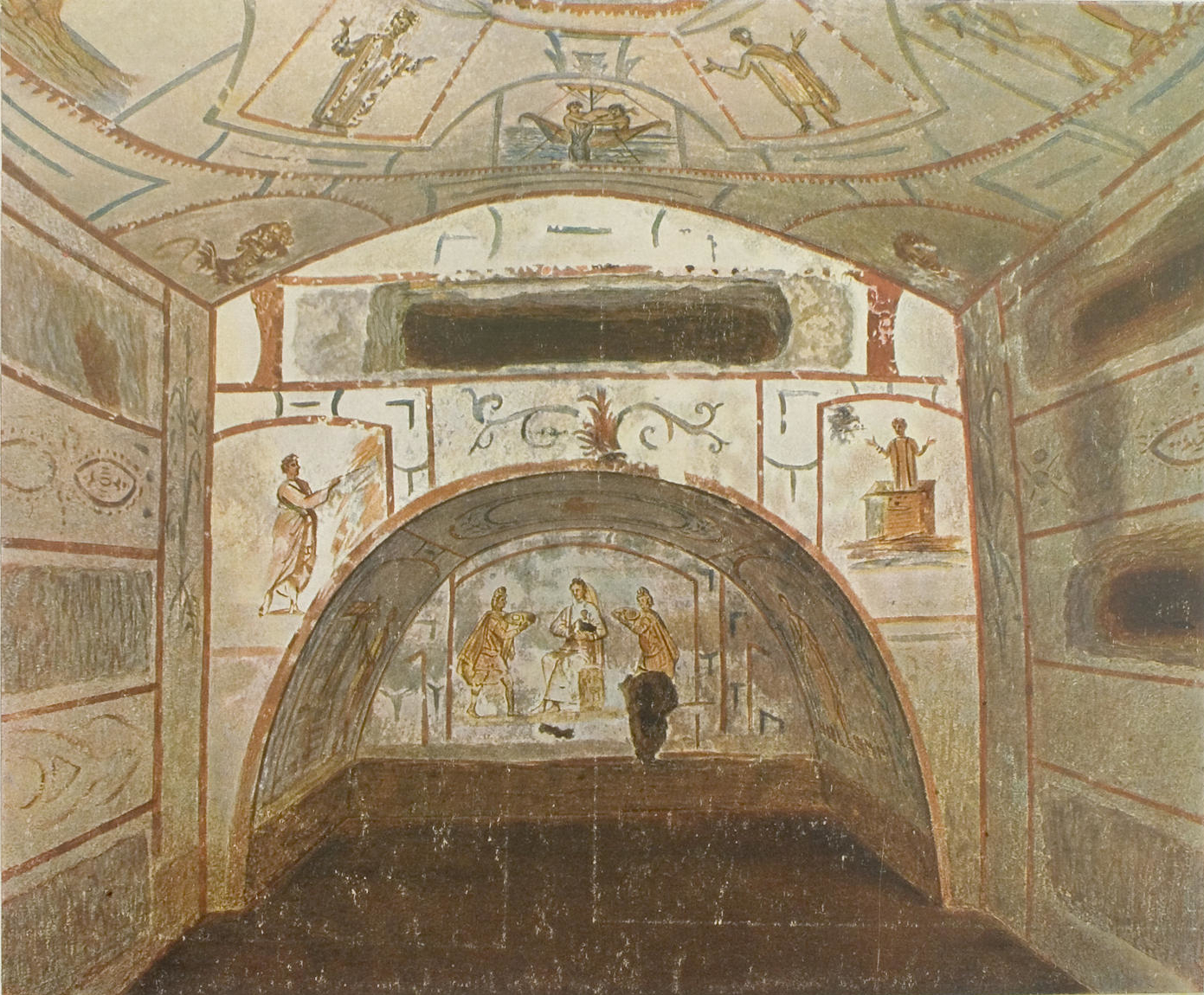
Catacombs of Marcellinus and Peter

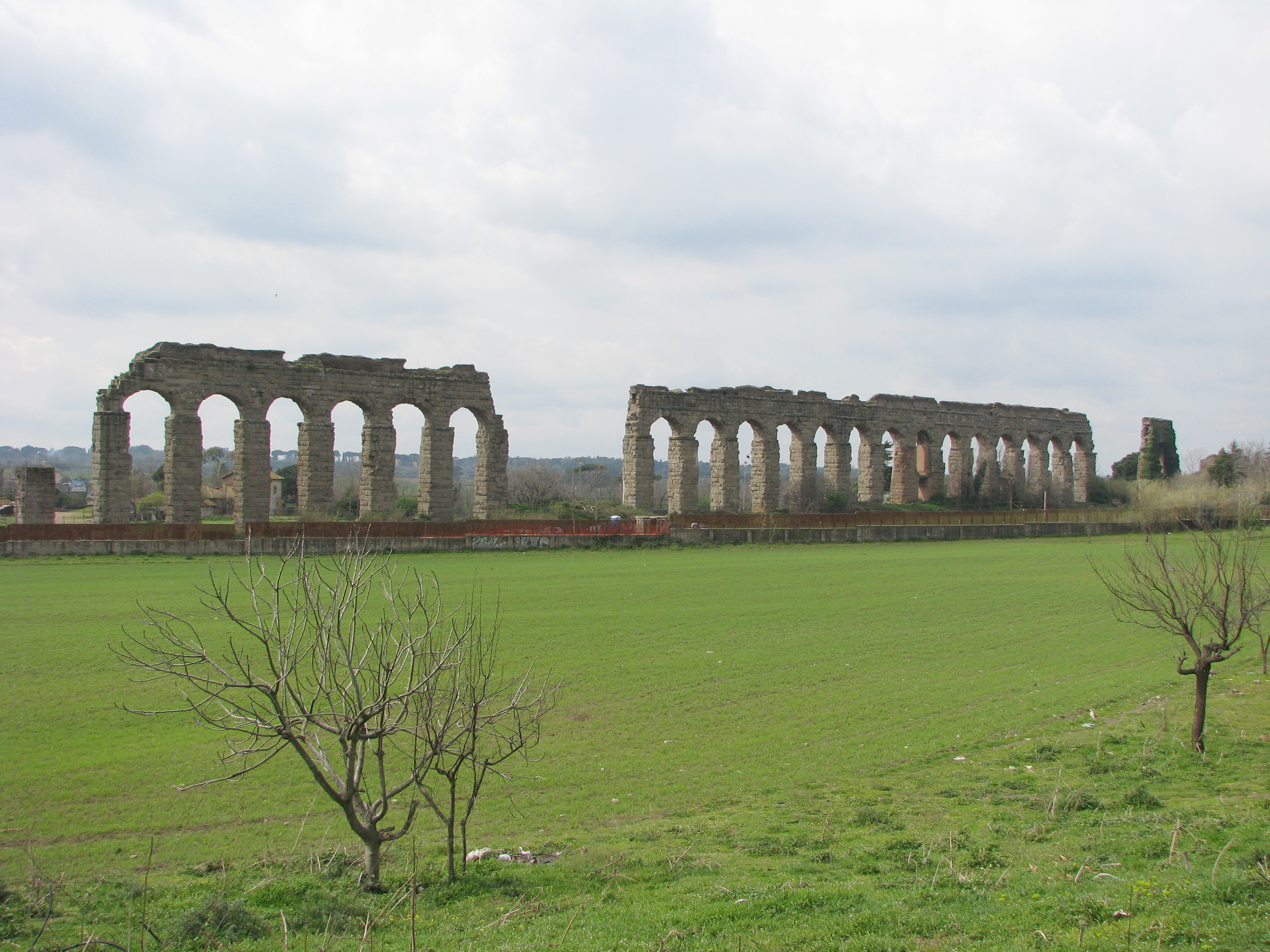
Aqua Claudia

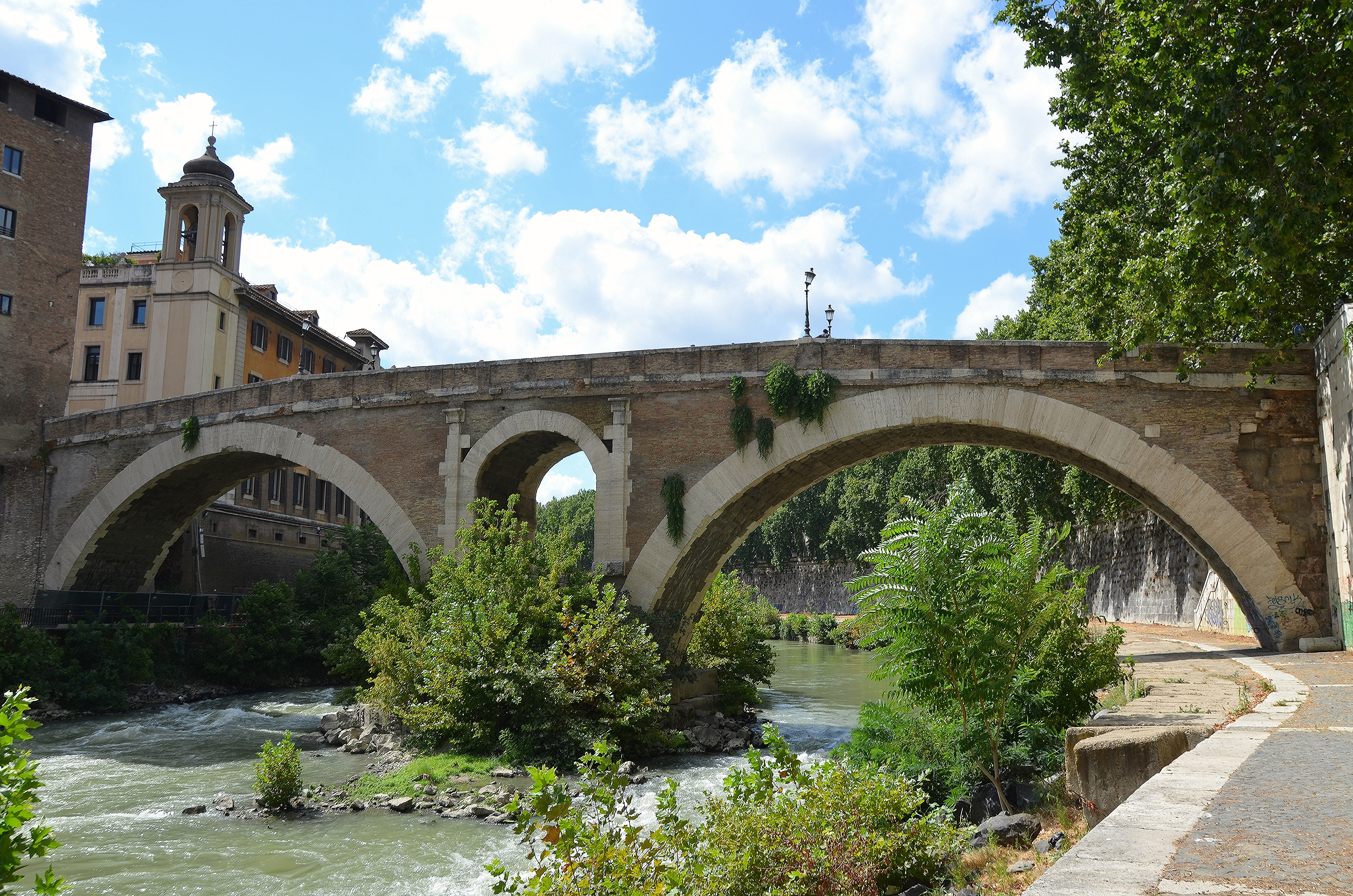
Pons Fabricius

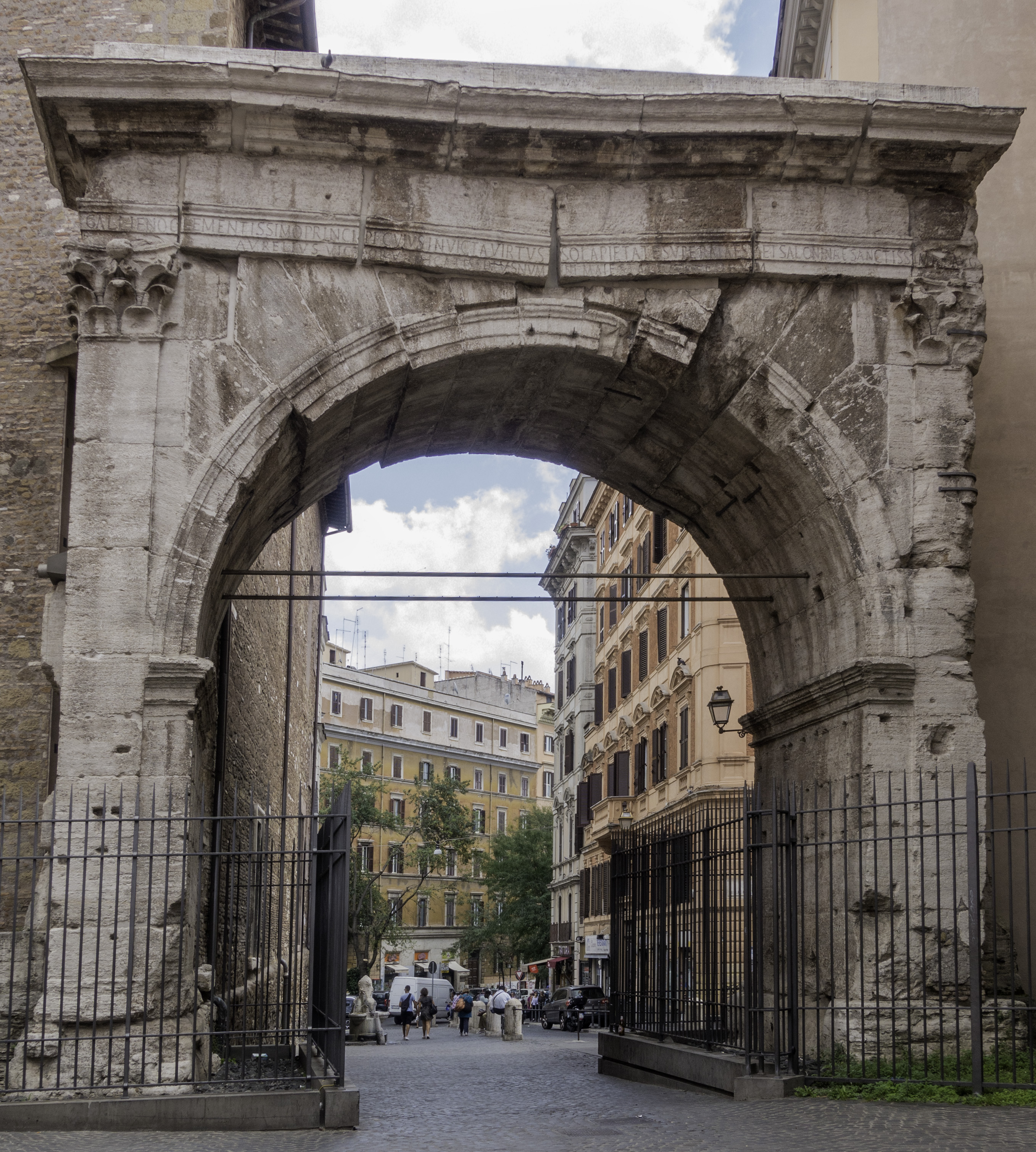
Porta Esquilina/Arch of Gallienus

Porta Maggiore and the Tomb of Eurysaces the Baker

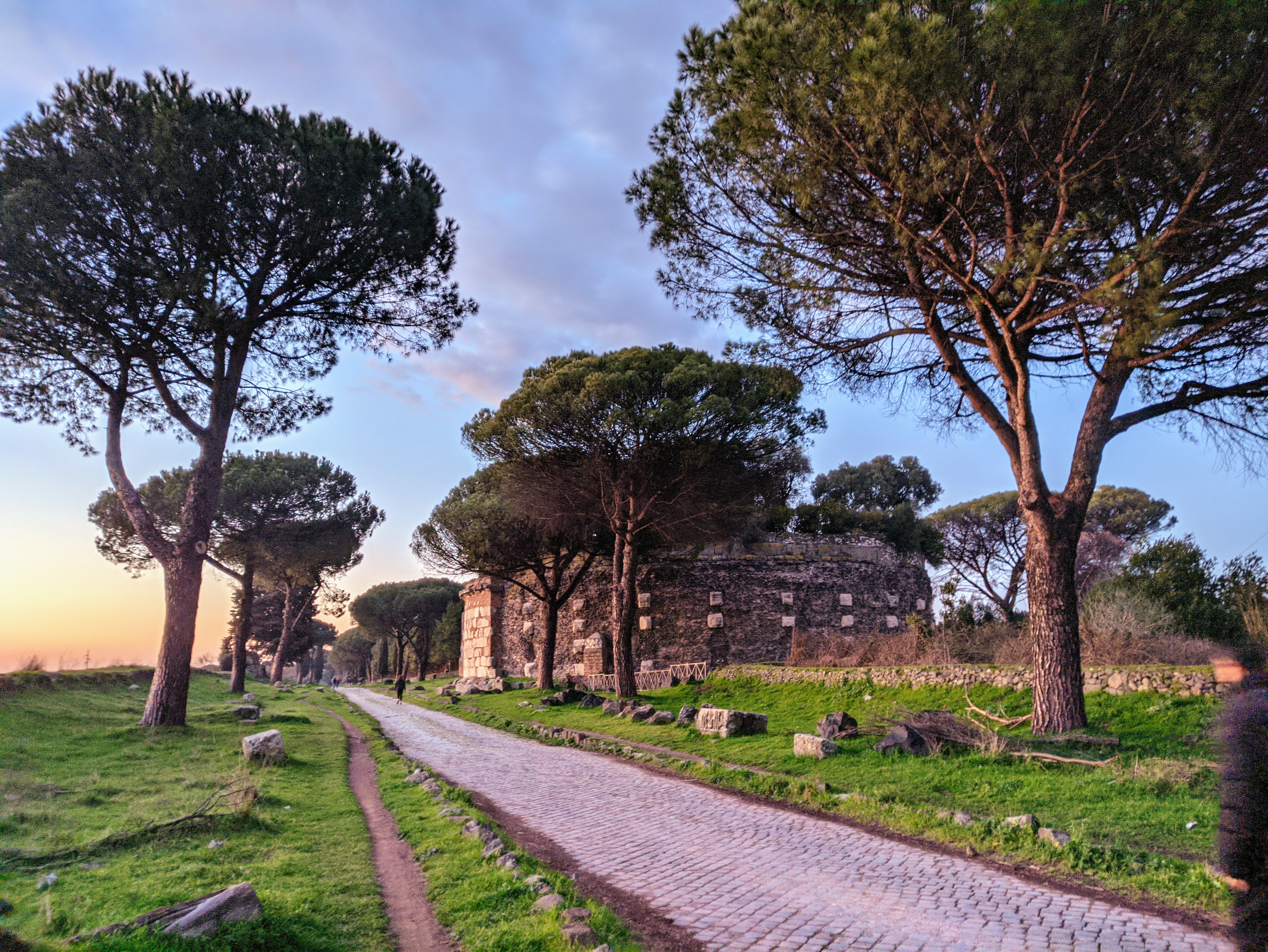
Casal Rotondo on the Via Appia

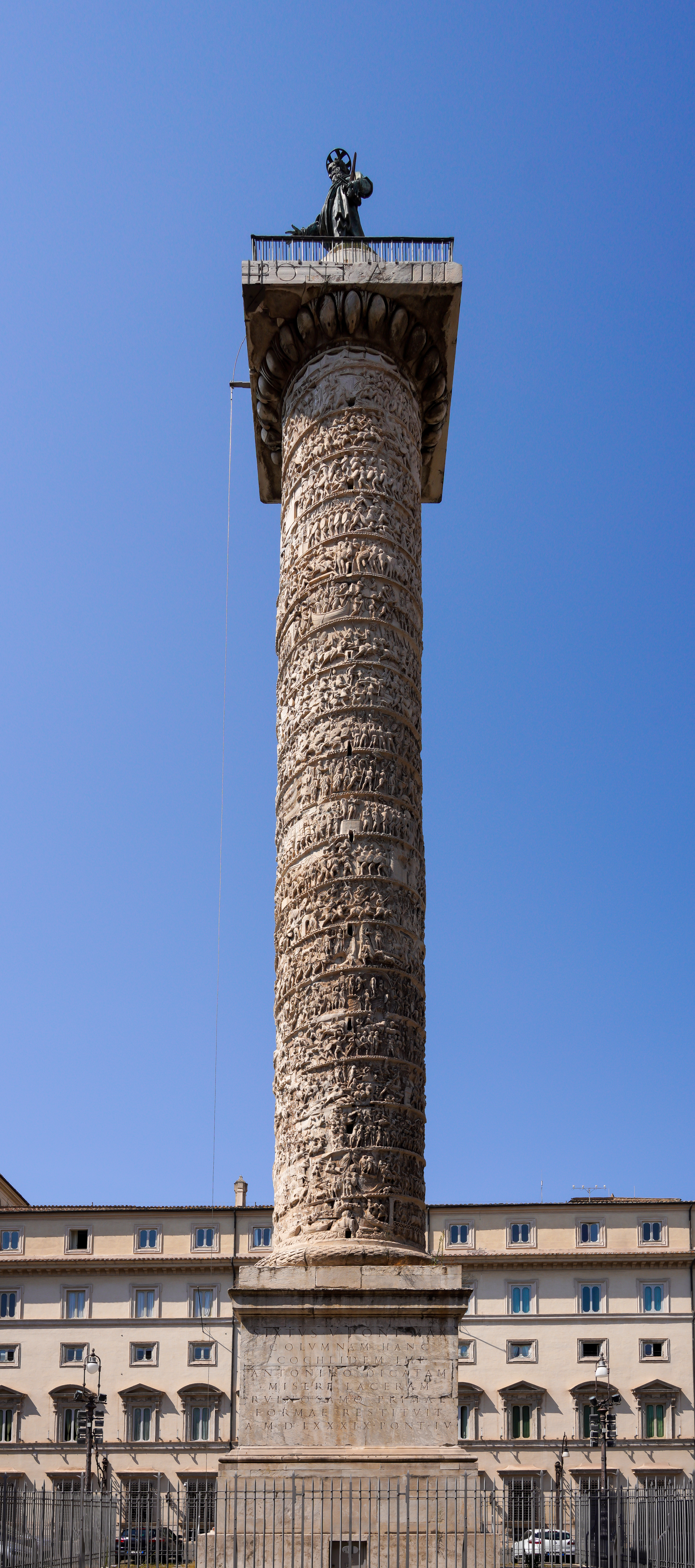
Column of Marcus Aurelius

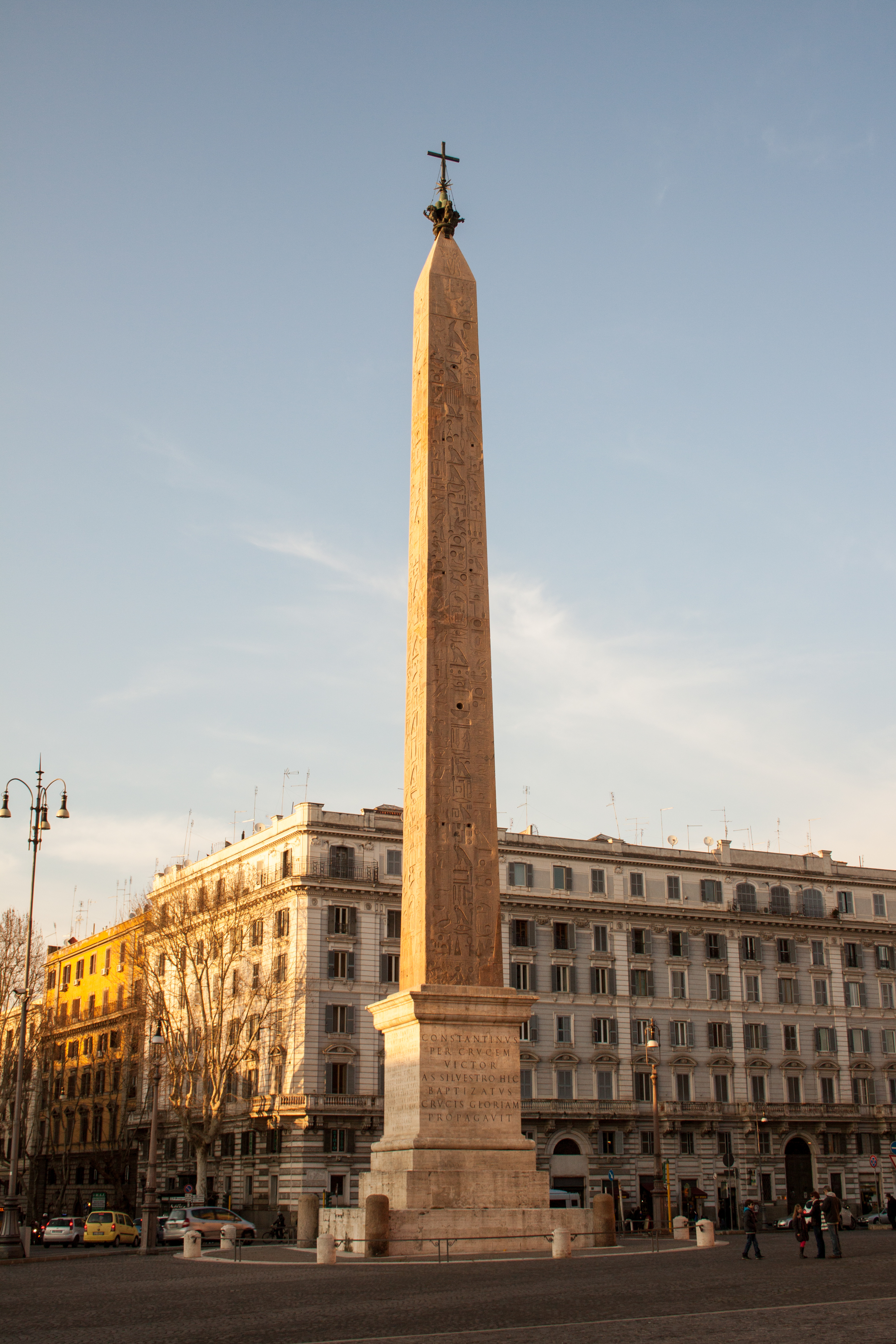
Lateran obelisk

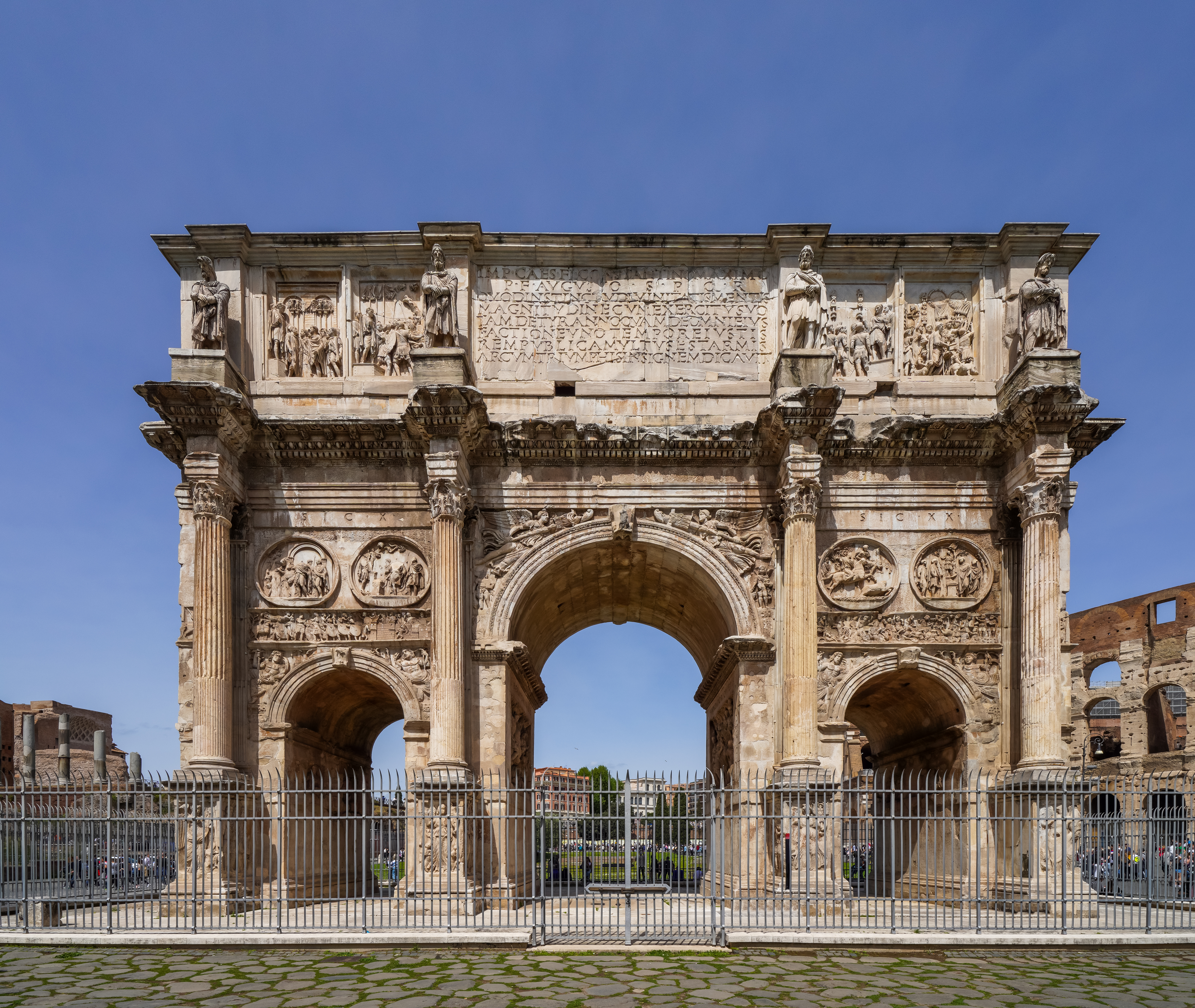
Arch of Constantine

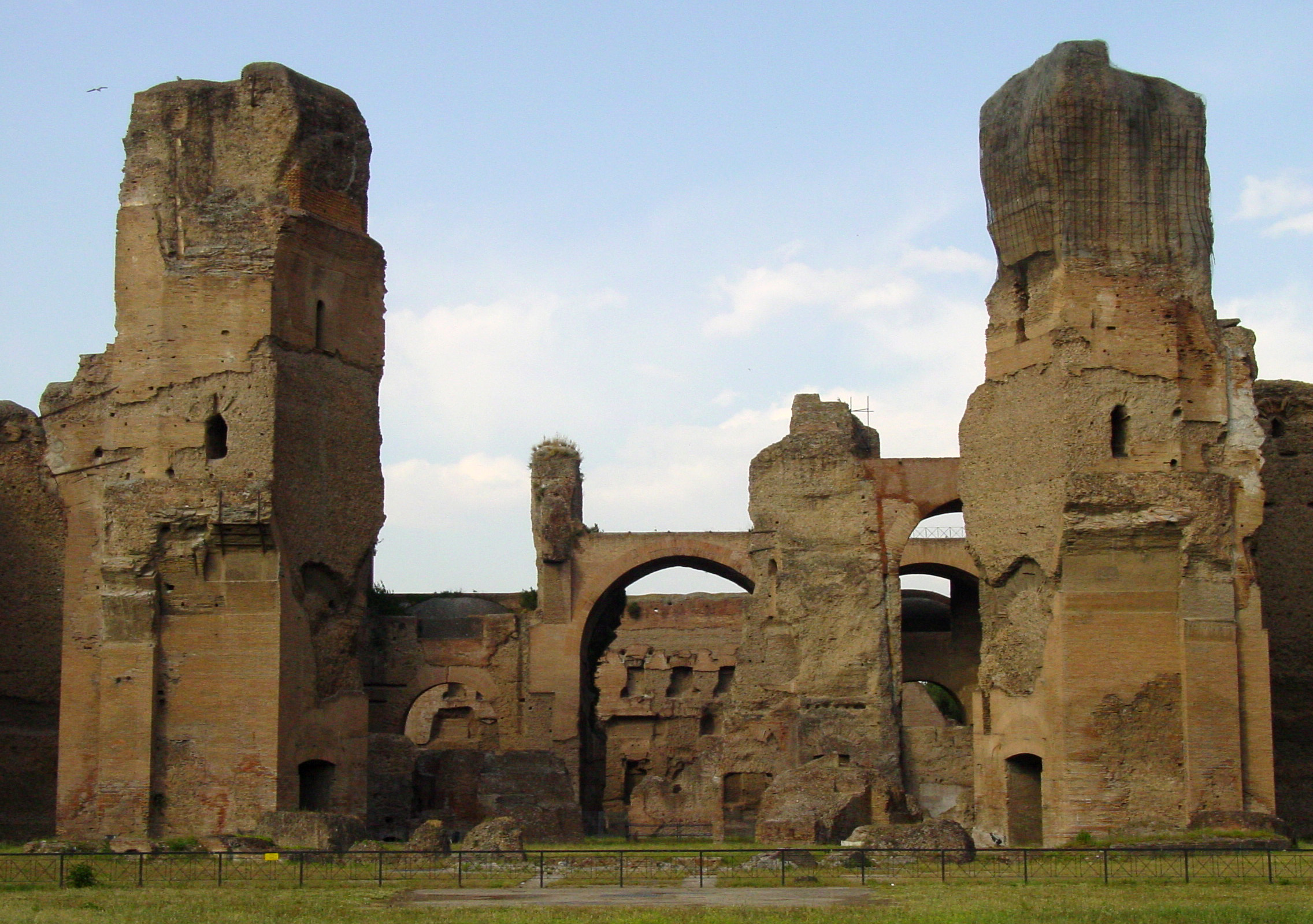
Baths of Caracalla

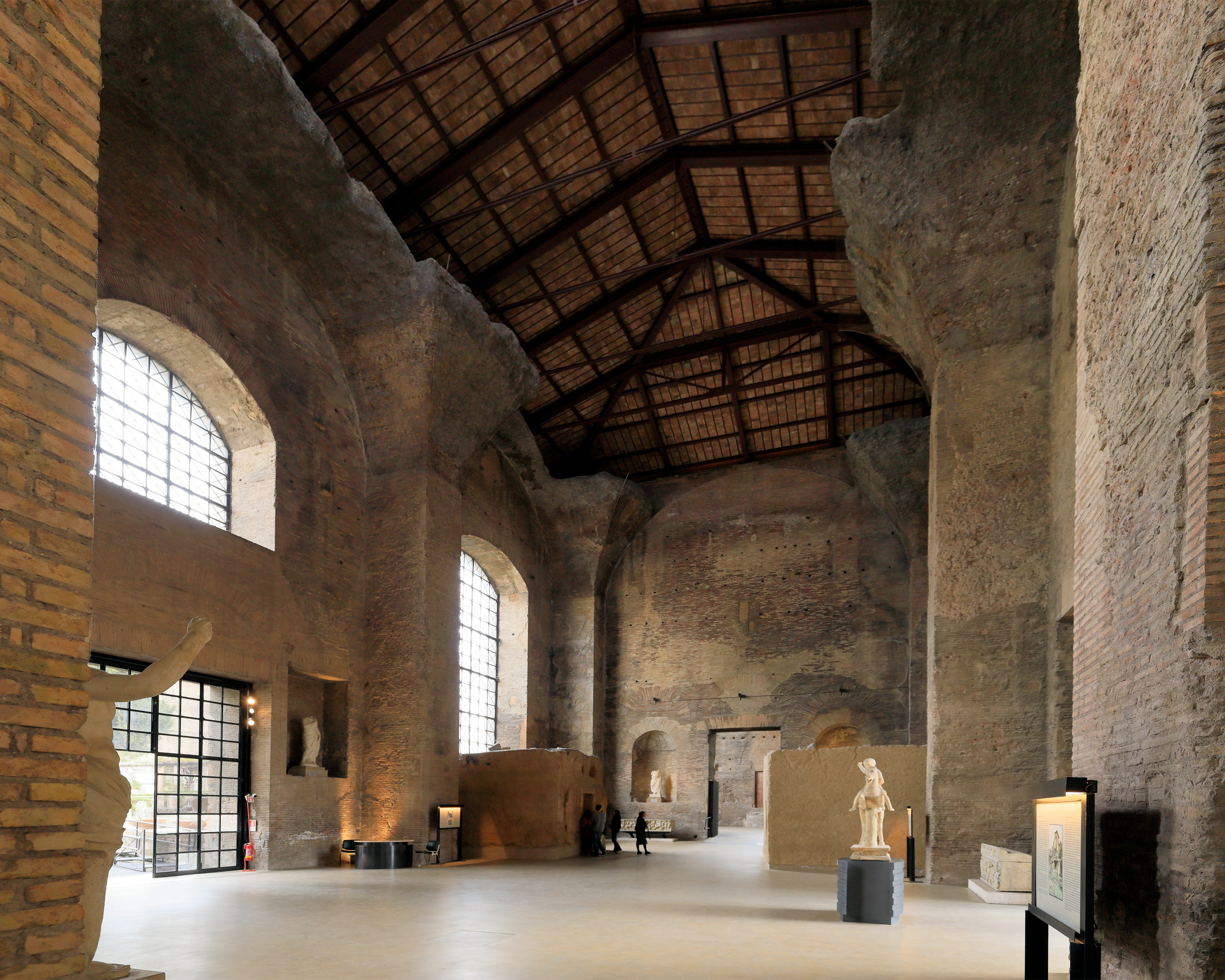
Interior of the Baths of Diocletian (now the Museo Nazionale Romano)

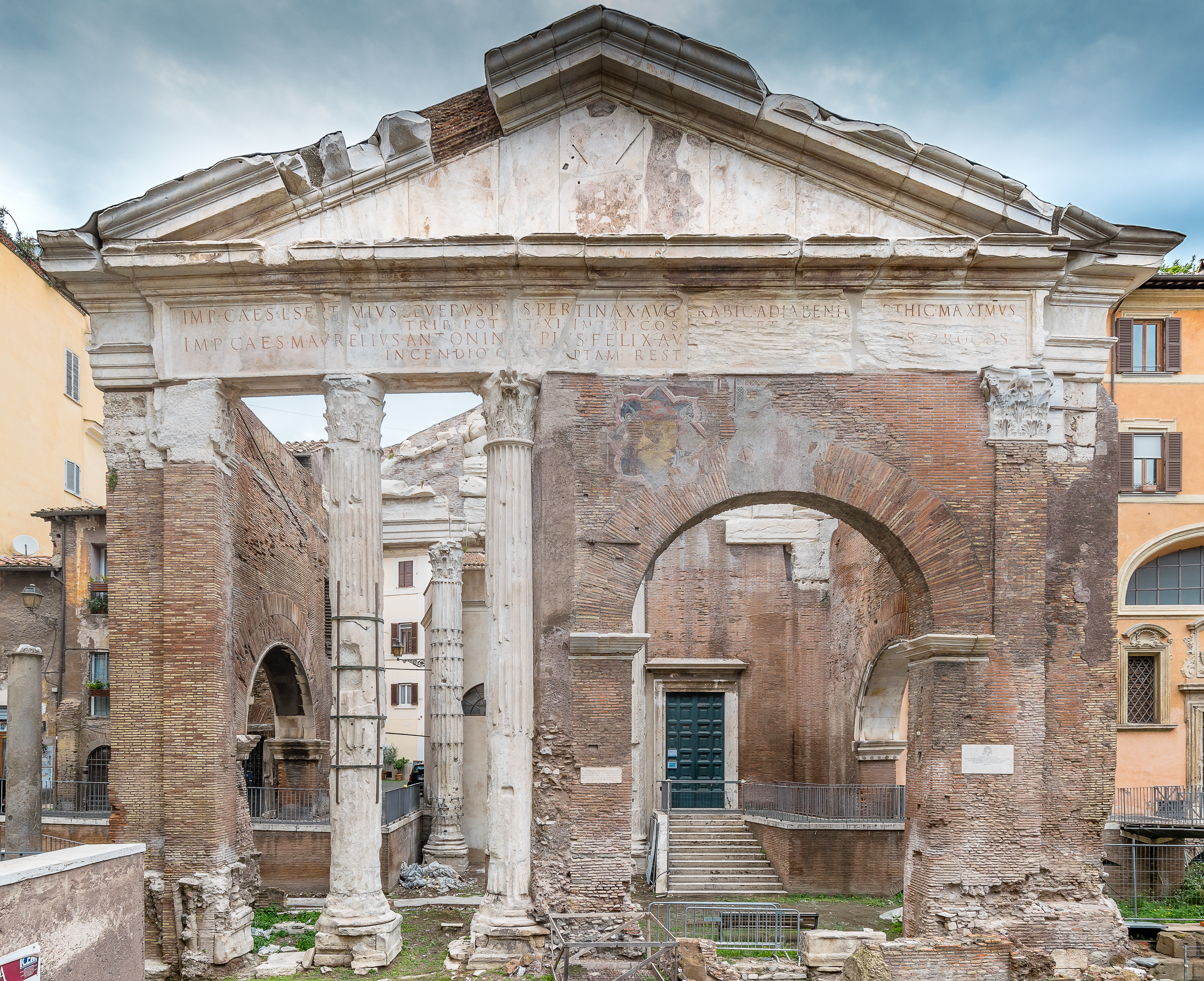
Porticus Octaviae

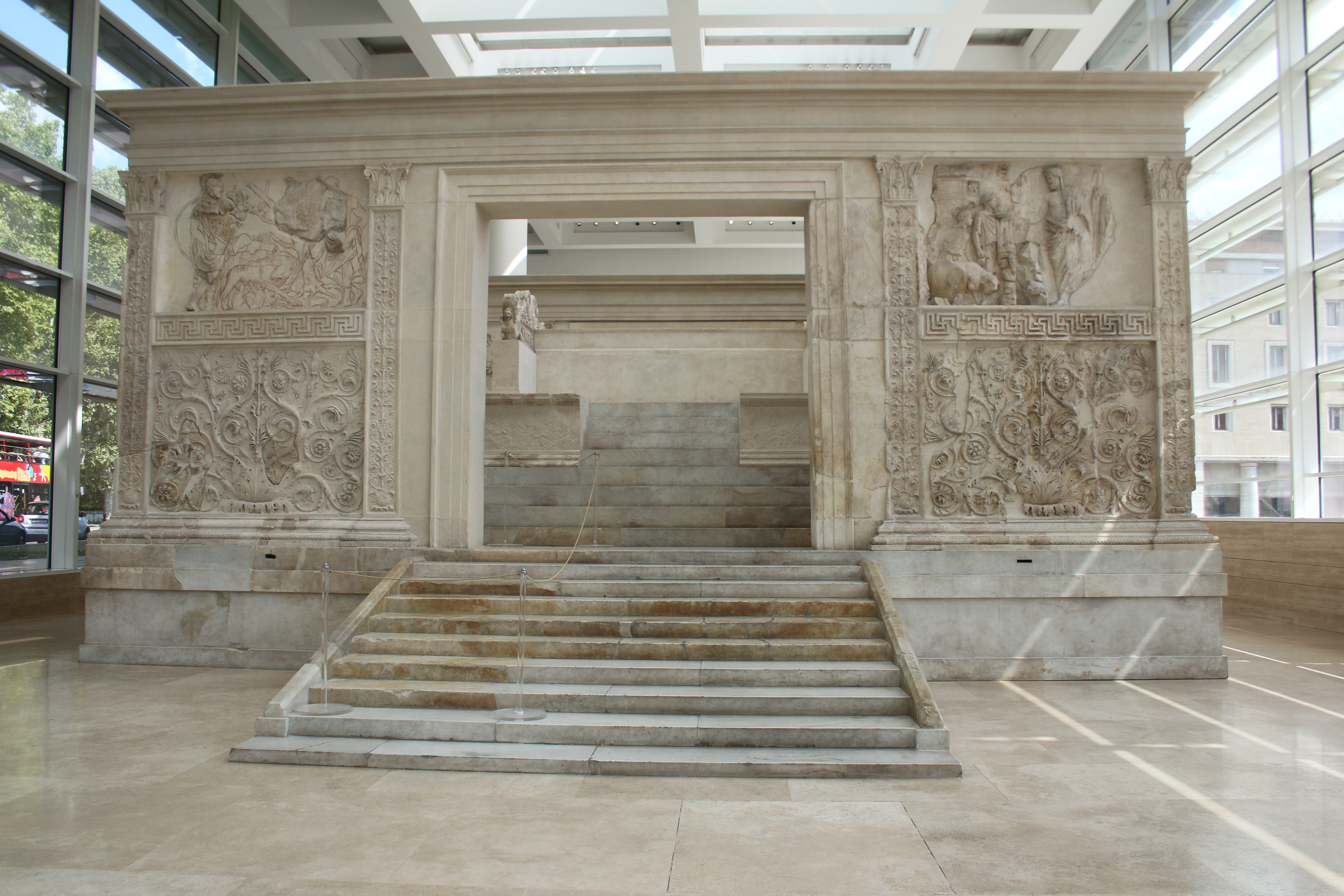
Ara Pacis

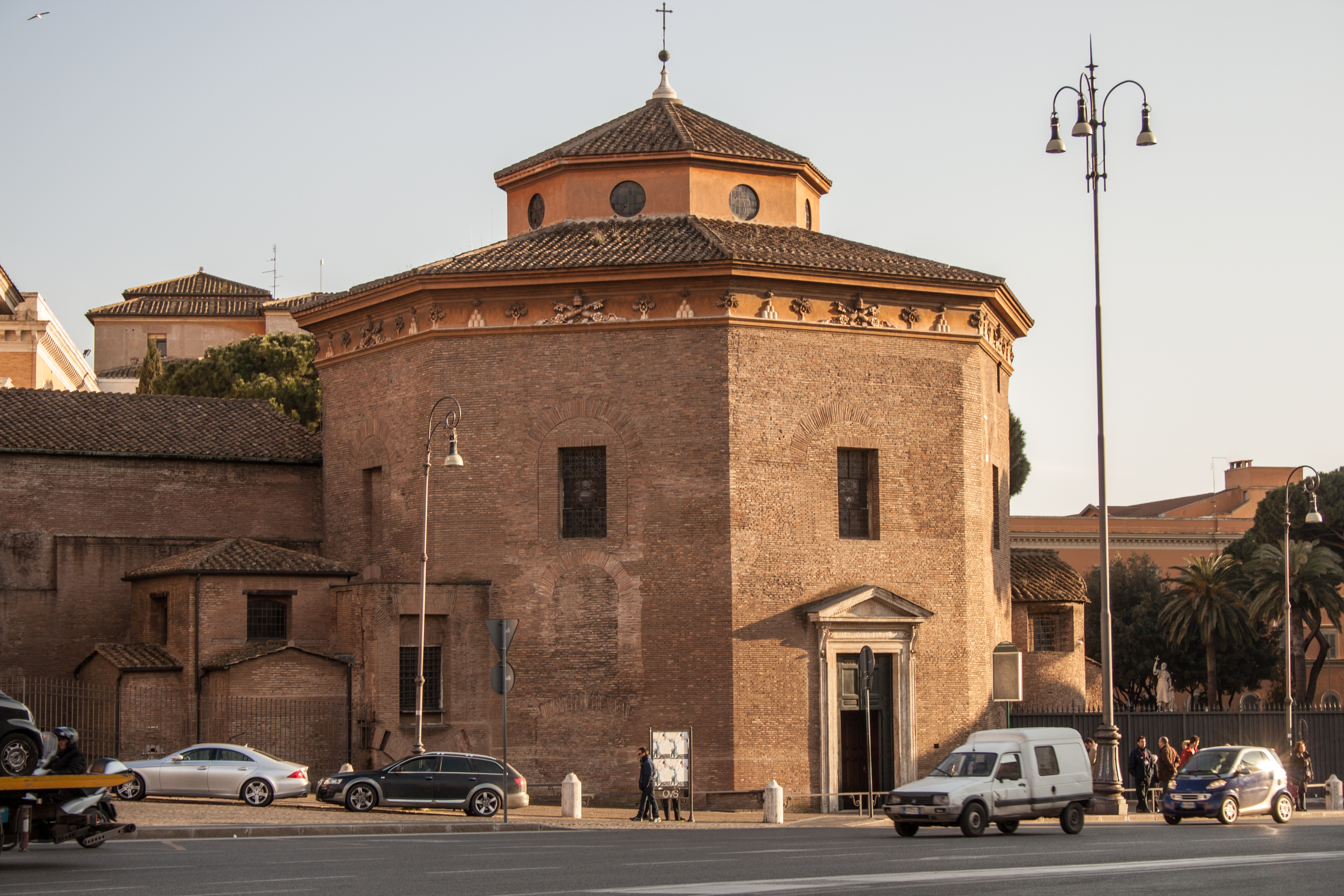
Lateran Baptistry

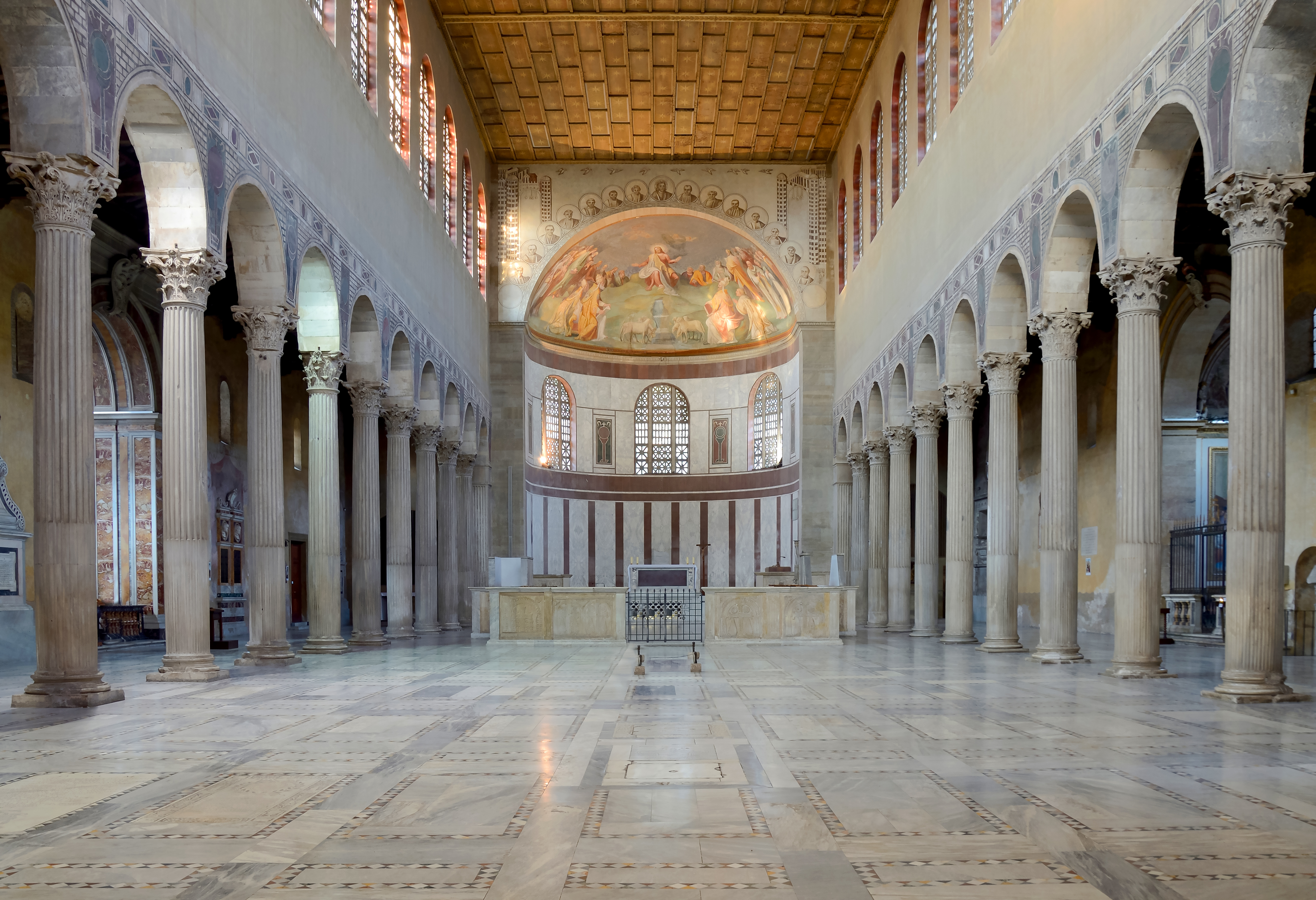
Interior of Santa Sabina

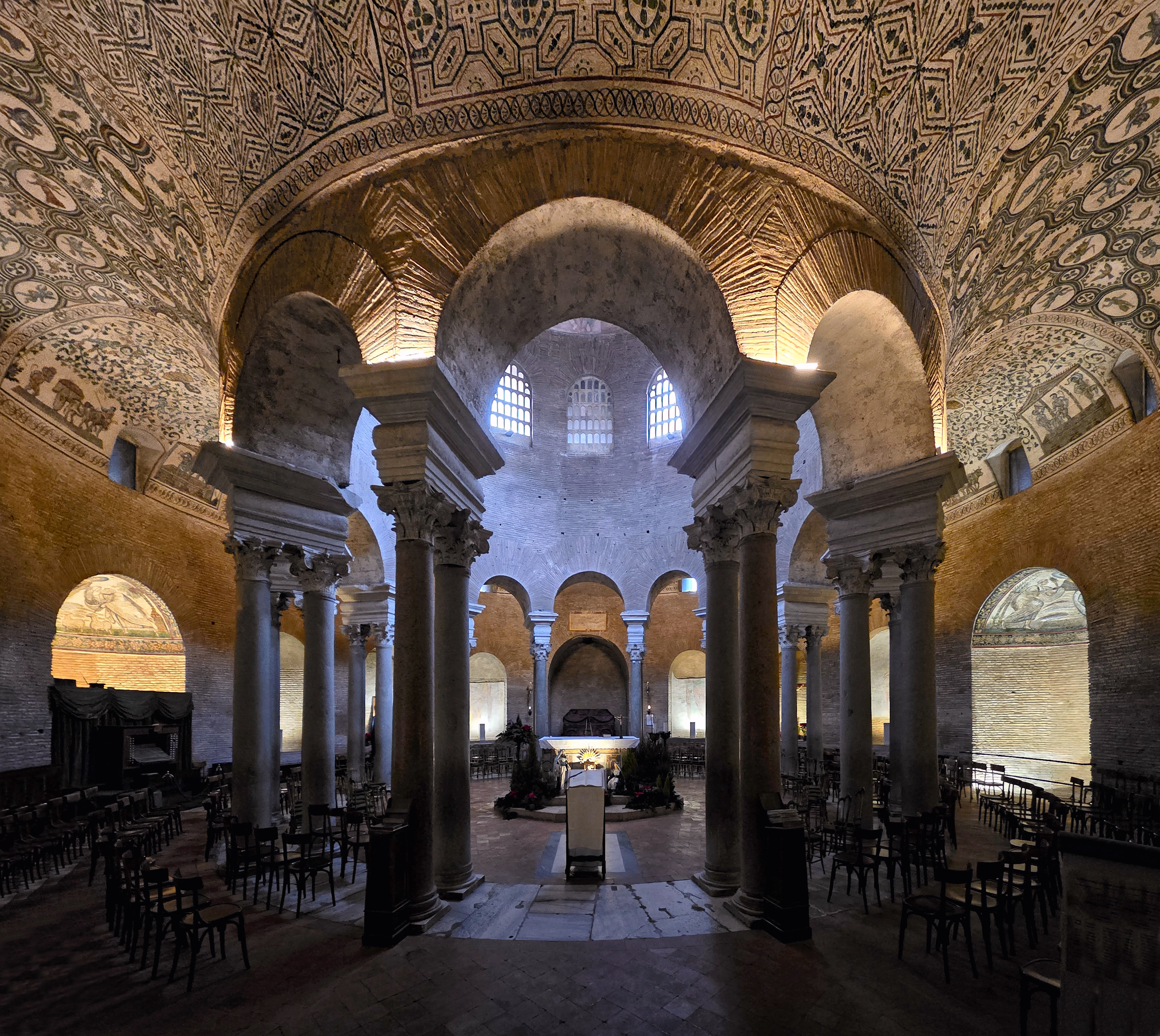
Interior of Santa Costanza

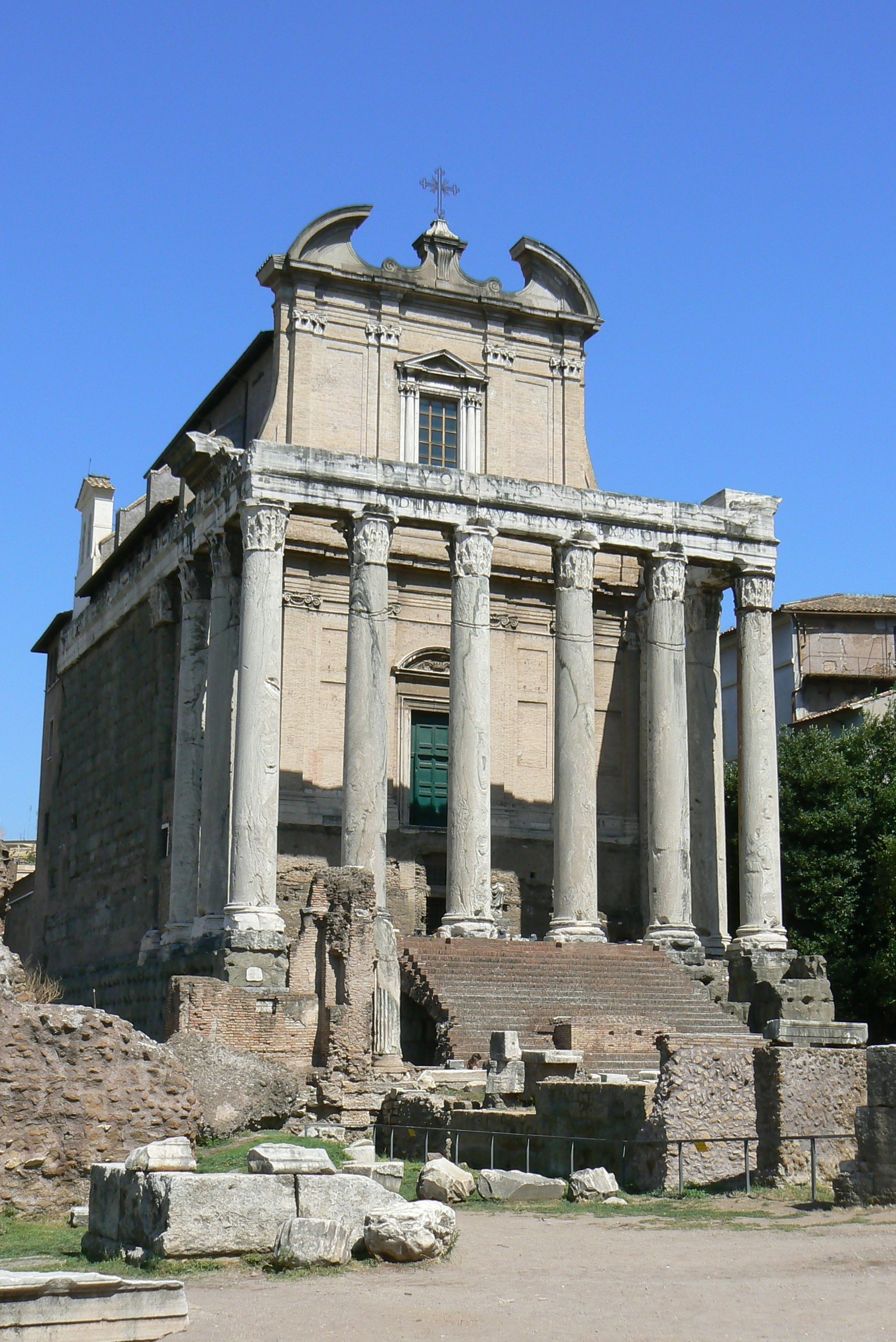
Temple of Antoninus and Faustina

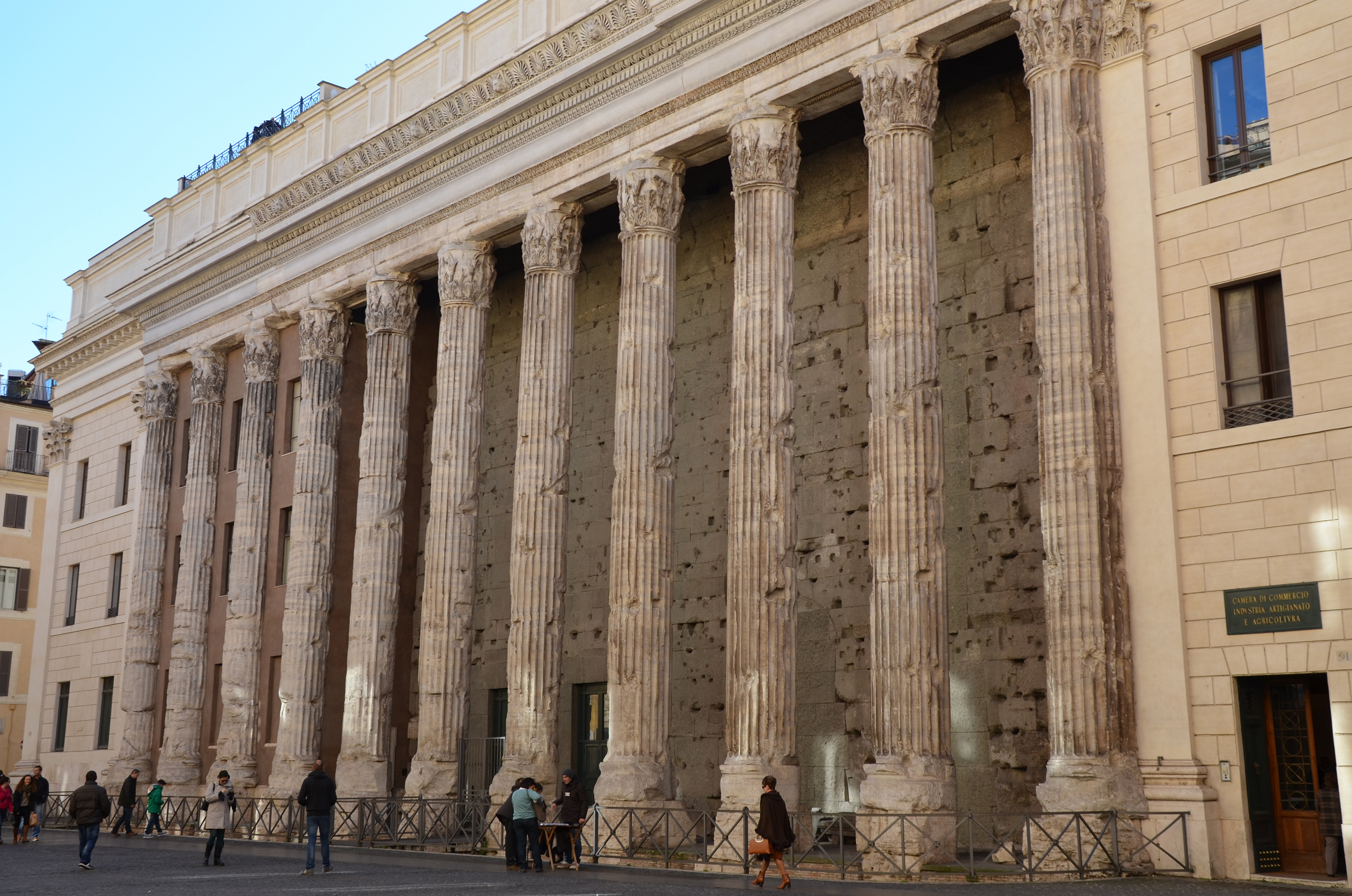
Temple of Hadrian

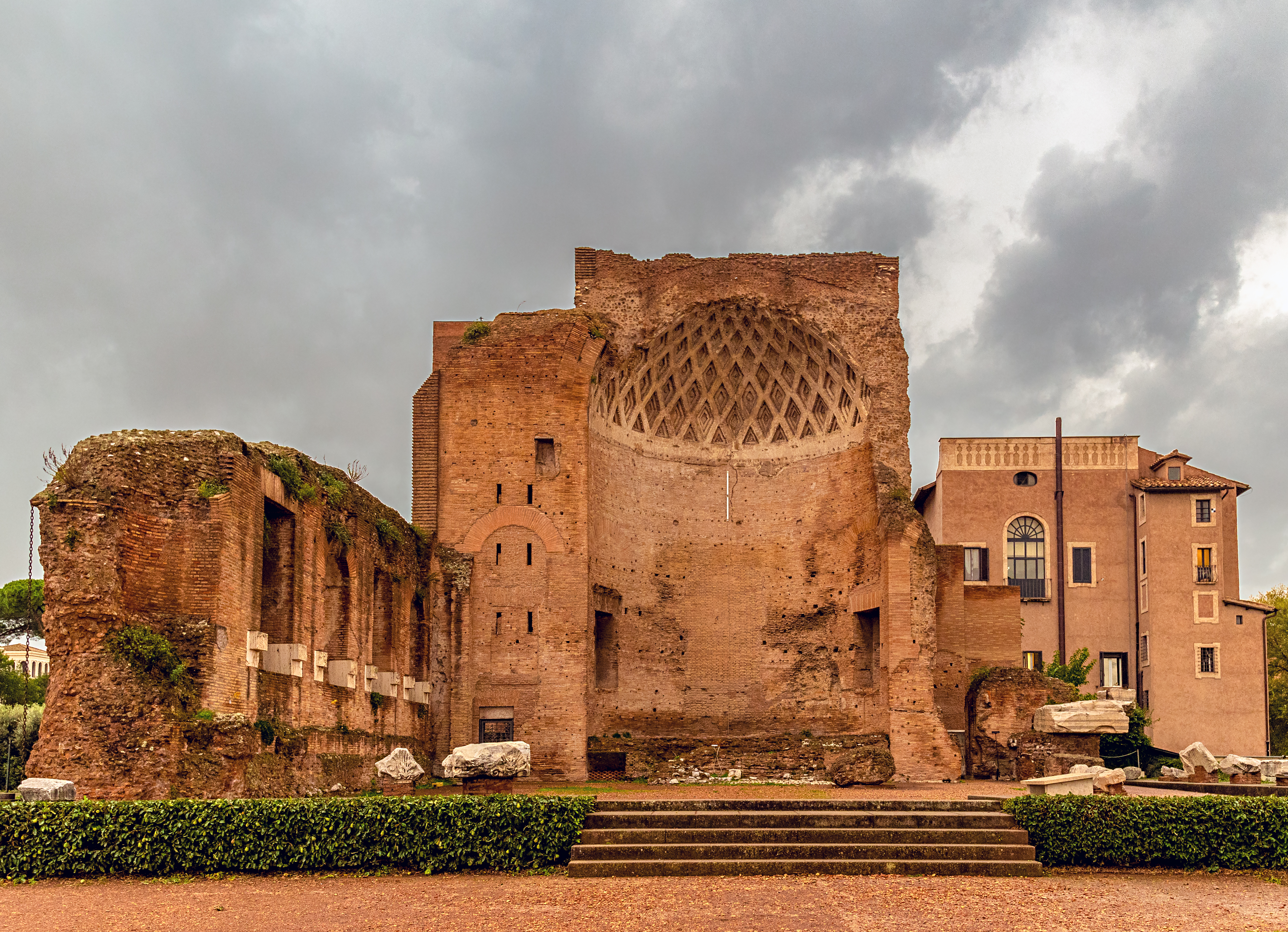
Temple of Venus and Roma

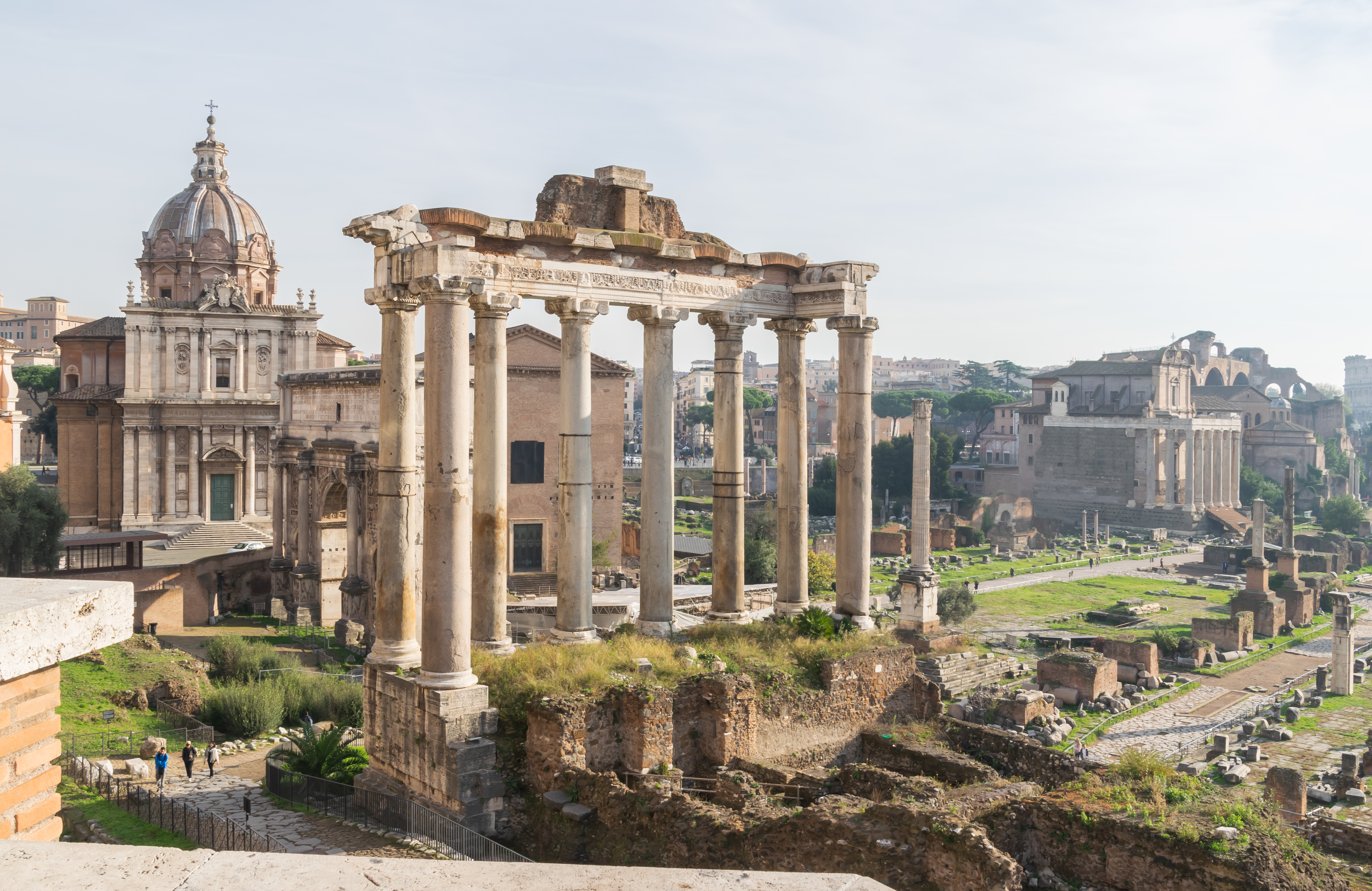
Temple of Saturn

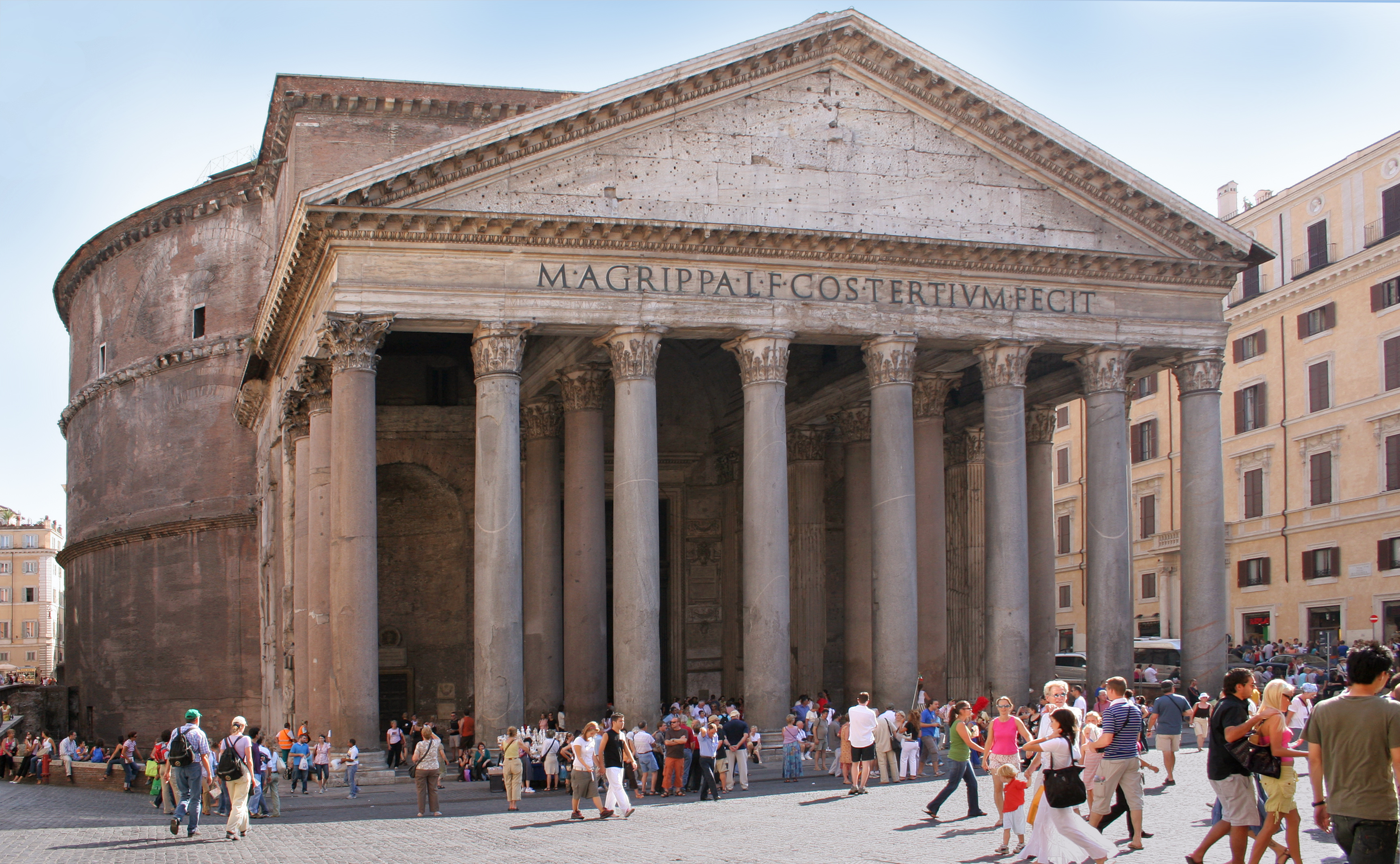
Pantheon

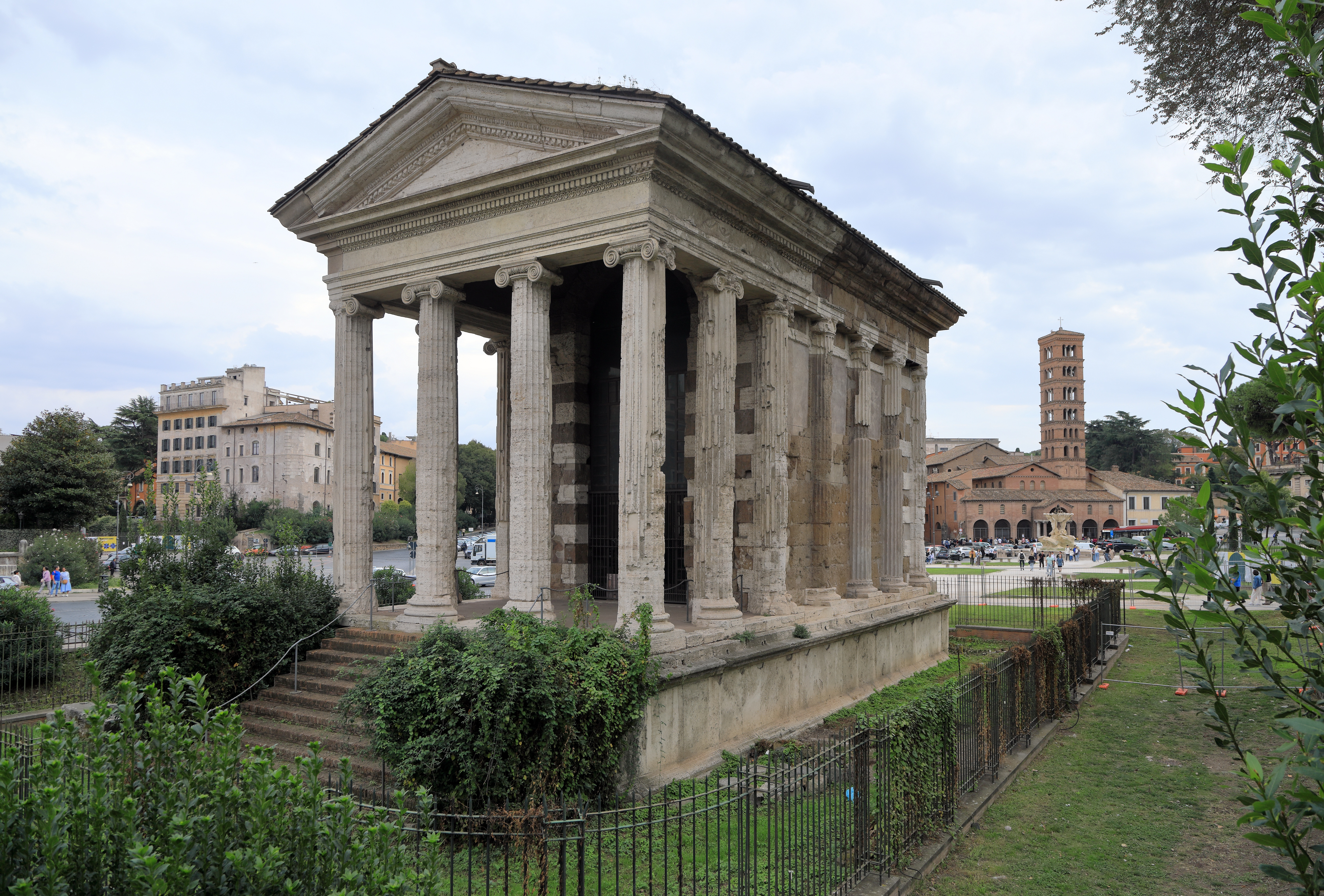
Temple of Portunus

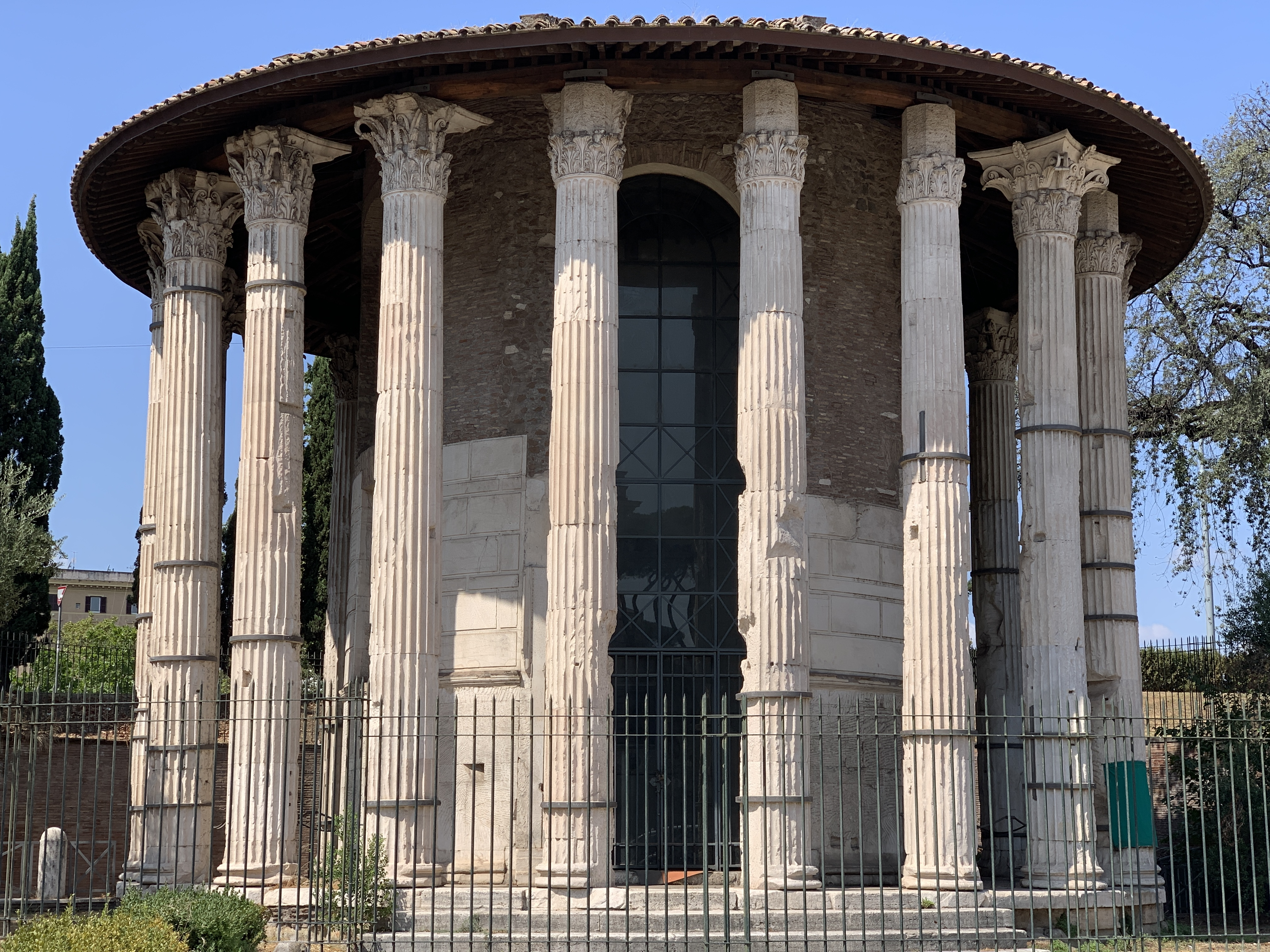
Temple of Hercules Victor

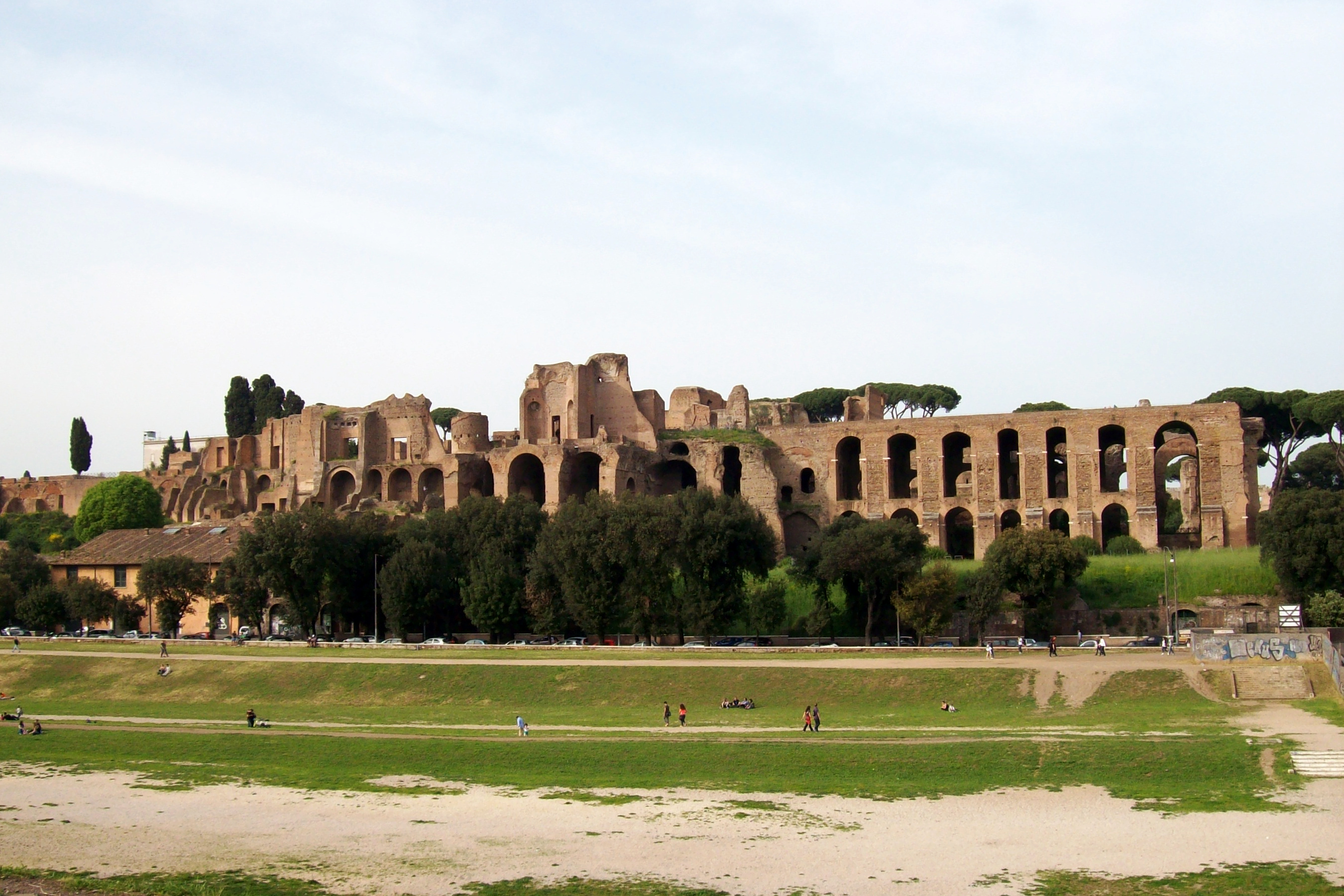
Domus Augustana and the Circus Maximus

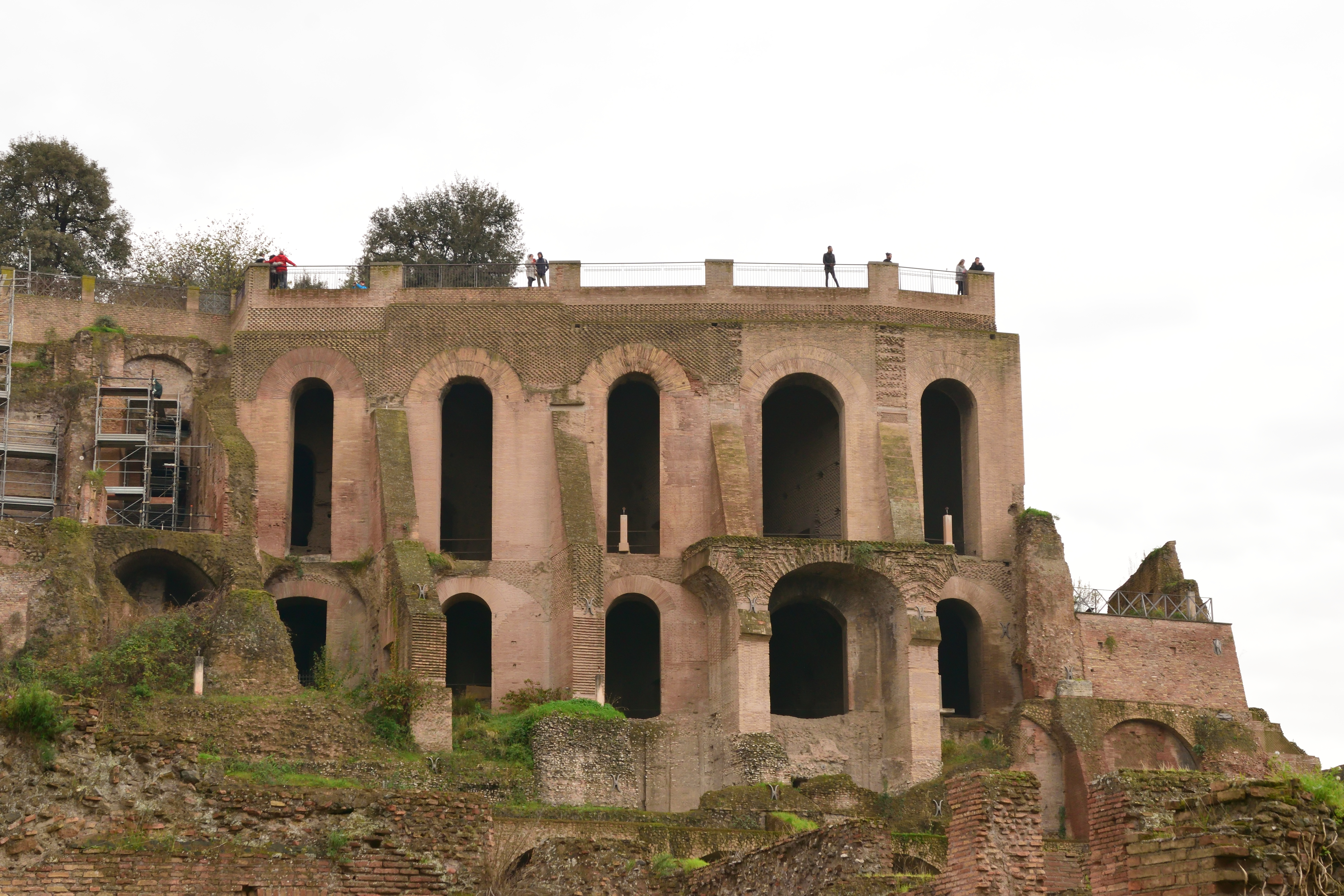
Domus Tiberiana

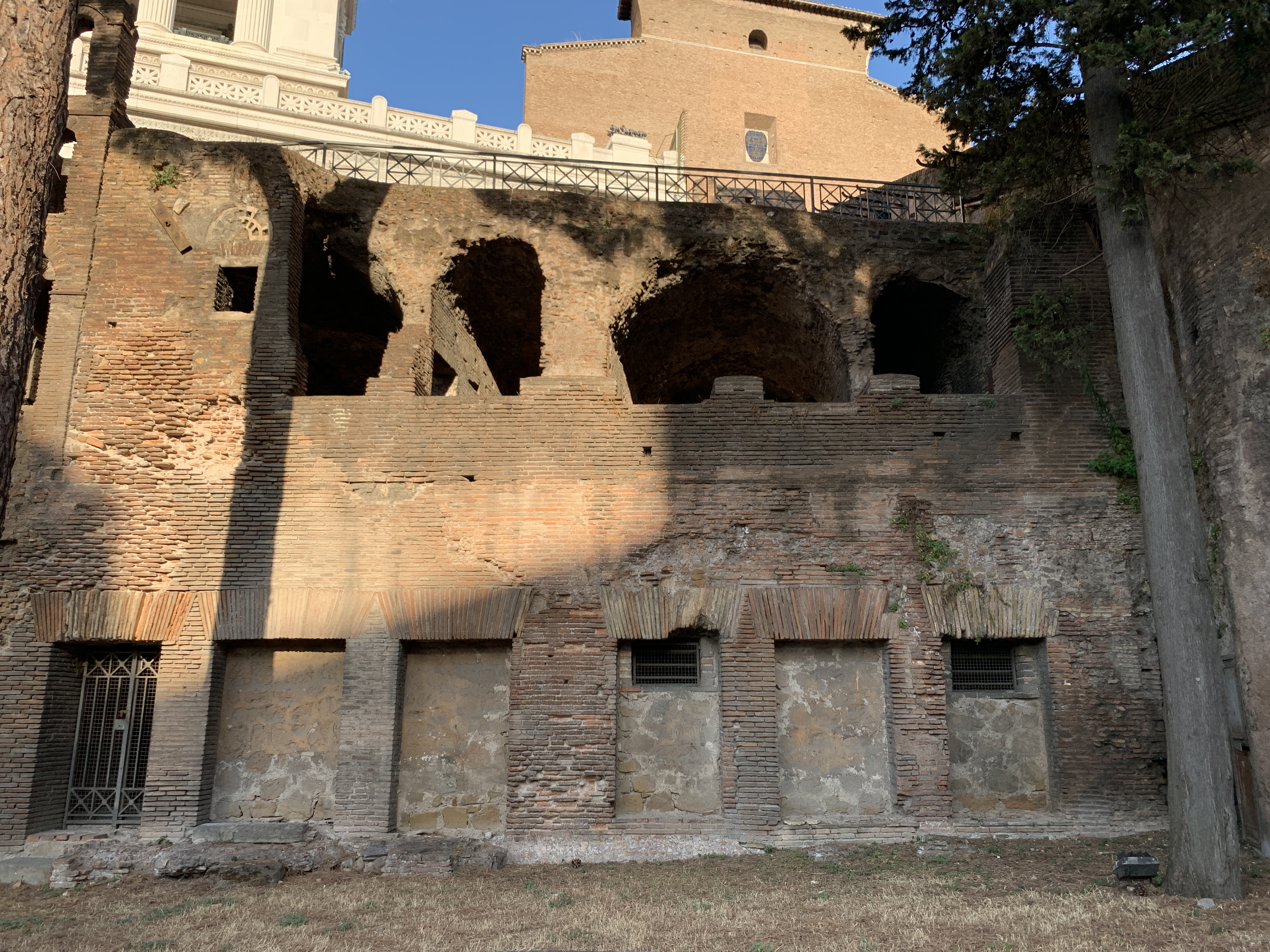
Insula dell'Ara Coeli

This is a list of ancient sites in Rome from classical antiquity, typically dating from the Roman Kingdom, Roman Republic and Roman Empire through late antiquity. This list includes sites attested through archaeological remains or historical sources, encompassing extant structures, incorporated remains, and significant lost monuments documented in ancient historical writing and modern scholarship.

Sites preserving substantial ancient structural or decorative remains are in bold.

== Civic structures ==
=== Administrative structures ===
- Atrium Libertatis
- Curia Cornelia
- Curia Hostilia
- **Curia Julia**
- Curia of Pompey
- Diribitorium
- Graecostasis
- **Mamertine Prison**
- Rostra
- Saepta Julia
- Tabularium
- Villa publica

=== Basilicas ===
- **Basilica Aemilia**
- Basilica Argentaria
- Basilica Fulvia
- **Basilica Julia**
- Basilica of Junius Bassus
- **Basilica of Maxentius**
- Basilica Hilariana
- Basilica of Neptune
- **Basilica Sotterranea di Porta Maggiore**
- Basilica Sempronia
- Basilica Opimia
- Basilica Porcia
- **Basilica Ulpia**

=== Fora ===
- Comitium
- **Forum of Augustus**
- **Forum Boarium**
- **Forum of Caesar**
- **Forum Holitorium**
- **Forum of Nerva**
- Forum Piscarium
- Forum Pistorium
- **Forum Romanum**
- Forum Suarium
- **Forum of Trajan**
- Forum Vinarium

=== Military structures ===
- Castra Nova equitum singularium
- Castra Peregrina
- **Castra Praetoria**
- Cohortium Vigilum Stationes
- Excubitorium
- Navalia
- Turris Mamilia

== Entertainment ==
=== Amphitheaters ===
- Amphitheater of Caligula
- Amphitheater of Nero
- Amphitheater of Statilius Taurus
- **Amphitheatrum Castrense**
- **Colosseum**

=== Circuses ===
- Circus Flaminius
- **Circus Maximus**
- **Circus of Maxentius**
- Circus of Nero
- Circus Varianus
- Trigarium

=== Theaters ===
- Naumachia of Augustus
- Naumachia Vaticana
- Odeon of Domitian
- Theater of Balbus
- **Theater of Marcellus**
- Theater of Nero
- Theater of Pompey

== Funerary structures ==
=== Aboveground burial spaces ===
- **Casal Rotondo**
- Meta Romuli
- **Mausoleum of Augustus**
- **Mausoleum of Hadrian**
- **Mausoleum of Helena**
- Mausoleum of Honorius
- **Mausoleum of Maxentius**
- **Pyramid of Cestius**
- Terebinth of Nero
- **Tomb of Appia Annia Regilla**
- **Tomb of Caecilia Metella**
- **Tomb of Eurysaces the Baker**
- Tomb of Gaio Publico Buibulo
- **Tomb of Hilarus Fuscus**
- **Tomb of Priscilla**
- **Tomb of the Haterii**
- **Tomb of the Scipios**
- **Tombs of via Latina**
- Ustrinum Antoninorum
- Ustrinum Domus Augustae

=== Underground burial spaces ===
- Ad Clivum Cucumeris Catacomb
- **Catacombs of Aproniano**
- Catacomb of Balbina
- Catacombs of Calepodius
- **Catacombs of Callixtus**
- Catacombs of Commodilla
- **Catacombs of Domitilla**
- Catacombs of Generosa
- Catacomb of the Iordani
- **Catacombs of Marcellinus and Peter**
- Catacomb of Novatian
- Catacomb of the Nunziatella
- Catacomb of Pontian
- **Catacombs of Praetextatus**
- **Catacombs of Priscilla**
- **Catacombs of Sant'Agnese fuori le mura**
- Catacomb of Sant'Alessandro
- Catacomb of Saint Castulus
- Catacomb of Sant'Ermete
- Catacombs of Santa Felicita
- Catacomb of Sant'Ilaria
- Catacomb of the Iordani
- Catacomb of Sant'Ippolito
- Catacombs of San Lorenzo fuori le mura
- Catacomb of San Nicomede
- **Catacombs of San Pancrazio**
- Catacomb of San Panfilo
- **Catacombs of San Sebastiano**
- Catacomb of Saint Thecla
- Catacombs of San Valentino
- Catacombs of San Zotico
- Catacomb of Santi Gordiano ed Epimaco
- Catacomb of Santi Marco e Marcelliano
- Catacomb of Saints Processus and Martinian
- Catacomb of Trasone
- Catacomb of the Two Felixes
- Columbaria of Vigna Codini
- Columbarium of Pomponius Hylas
- Esquiline Necropolis
- Hypogeum of the Aurelii
- Hypogeum of Trebius Justus
- Hypogeum of Vibia
- **Vatican Necropolis**
  - Tomb of the Julii
- **Via Anapo catacombs**
- Via Dino Compagni Hypogeum
- Via Livenza Hypogeum
- **Vigna Randanini**
- Villa Torlonia Catacombs

== Infrastructure ==
=== Aqueducts ===
- **Aqua Alexandrina**
- Aqua Alsietina
- **Aqua Anio Novus**
- **Aqua Anio Vetus**
- Aqua Appia
- **Aqua Claudia**
- **Aqua Julia**
- **Aqua Marcia**
- **Aqua Tepula**
- **Aqua Traiana**
- **Aqua Virgo**

=== Bridges ===
- **Pons Aelius**
- **Pons Aemilius**
- Pons Agrippae
- Pons Aurelius
- **Pons Cestius**
- **Pons Fabricius**
- **Pons Milvius**
- Pons Neronianus
- **Ponte Nomentano**
- Pons Probi
- Pons Sublicius

=== Fountains and sewers ===
- Cloaca Circi Maximi
- Cloaca Maxima
- **Fontana della Pigna**
- Lacus Juturnae
- Lacus Orphei
- Lacus Pastorum
- Meta Sudans
- Nymphaeum divi Alexandri
- Puteal Scribonianum
- Septizodium

=== Roads ===
- Alta Semita
- Argiletum
- **Clivus Capitolinus**
- Clivus Delphini
- Cilvus Lautumiarum
- Clivus Palatinus
- Clivus Publicius
- **Clivus Scauri**
- Clivus Suburanus
- Clivus Victoriae
- Scalae Caci
- Scalae Cassi
- Scalae Gemoniae
- **Umbilicus urbis Romae**
- **Via Appia**
- Via Ardeatina
- Via Asinaria
- Via Aurelia
- Via Collatia
- Via Cornelia
- **Via Flaminia**
- Via Labicana
- Via Lata
- Via Latina
- Via Laurentina
- **Via Ostiensis**
- Via Portuensis
- Via Praenestina
- **Via Sacra**
- Via Salaria
- Via Tiburtina
- Via Trionfale
- Via Tuscolana
- Vicus Capitis Africae
- Vicus Collis Viminalis
- Vicus Jugarius
- Vicus Longus
- Vicus Patricius
- Vicus Piscinae Publicae
- Vicus Portae Raudusculanae
- Vicus Tuscus

=== Walls and gates ===
- Aurelian Walls
  - **Porta Ardeatina**
  - **Porta Asinaria**
  - Porta Cornelia (Porta Aurelia-Sancti Petri)
  - **Porta Flaminia** (Porta del Popolo)
  - **Porta Latina**
  - **Porta Metronia**
  - Porta Nomentana
  - **Porta Pinciana**
  - **Porta Prenestina** (Porta Maggiore)
  - Porta Salaria
  - **Porta San Pancrazio**
  - **Porta San Paolo** (Porta Ostiense)
  - **Porta San Sebastiano** (Porta Appia)
  - **Porta Settimiana**
  - **Porta Tiburtina**
- Murus Romuli
- Servian Walls
  - **Porta Caelimontana**
  - Porta Capena
  - Porta Collina
  - **Porta Esquilina**
  - Porta Flumentana
  - Porta Fontinalis
  - Porta Lavernalis
  - Porta Naevia
  - Porta Querquetulana
  - Porta Quirinalis
  - Porta Raudusculana
  - Porta Salutaris
  - Porta Sanqualis
  - Porta Trigemina
  - Porta Viminale

== Monuments ==
=== Columns ===
- Columna Lactaria
- Columna Maenia
- Columna Rostrata C. Duilii
- Column of Antoninus Pius
- **Column of Marcus Aurelius**
- **Column of Phocas**
- Five-Columns Monument
- **Trajan's Column**

=== Obelisks ===
- **Agonale obelisk**
- **Antinous obelisk**
- **Esquiline obelisk**
- **Flaminio obelisk**
- **Lateran obelisk**
- **Matteiano obelisk**
- **Minervo obelisk**
- **Pantheon obelisk**
- **Quirinale obelisk**
- **Sallustiano obelisk**
- **Solarium Augusti**
- **Vatican obelisk**

=== Statuary ===
- **Abbot Luigi**
- **Babuino**
- **Colossus of Constantine**
- Colossus of Nero
- **Equestrian Statue of Marcus Aurelius**
- **Farnese Bull**
- **Farnese Hercules**
- **Marforio**
- **Pasquino**
- Quadriga statue atop the Arch of Titus
- Quadriga statue atop the Arch of Septimius Severus
- Statuary group in the Forum of Augustus
- Statuary group in the Forum of Caesar

=== Triumphal arches ===
- Arch of Arcadius, Honorius and Theodosius
- **Arcus Argentariorum**
- Arch of Augustus
- Arch of Claudius
- **Arch of Constantine**
- Arch of Dolabella
- Arch of Domitian
- **Arch of Drusus**
- **Arch of Gallienus**
- Arch of Germanicus
- Arch of Gratian, Valentinian and Theodosius
- **Arch of Janus**
- Arch of Lentulus and Crispinus
- Arch of Marcus Aurelius
- Arch of Nero
- Arcus Novus
- Arch of Octavius
- Arch of Pietas
- Arch of Portugal
- Arch of Scipio
- **Arch of Septimius Severus**
- Arch of Tiberius
- **Arch of Titus**
- Arch of Titus (Circus Maximus)

== Public amenities ==
=== Baths ===
- Baths of Agrippa
- **Baths of Caracalla**
- Baths of Commodus
- Baths of Constantine
- Baths of Decius
- **Baths of Diocletian**
- Thermae Helenianae
- Baths of Licinius Sura
- Baths of Nero
- Baths of Septimius Severus
- Baths of Titus
- **Baths of Trajan**

=== Commercial structures ===
- Emporium
- Horrea Aniciana
- Horrea candelaria
- Horrea Agrippiana
- Horrea Galbae
- Horrea piperiana
- Macellum Liviae
- Macellum Magnum
- Portus
- Portus Tiberinus
- Trajan's Market

=== Educational structures ===
- **Athenaeum**
- Atrium Libertatis
- Library in the Baths of Diocletian
- Library of Palatine Apollo
- Ludus Dacicus
- **Ludus Magnus**
- Ulpian Library

=== Porticoes ===
- Porticus Absidata
- **Porticus Aemilia**
- Porticus Argonautarum
- Porticus Catuli
- **Porticus Deorum Consentium**
- Porticus Divorum
- Porticus Liviae
- Porticus Margaritaria
- Porticus Minuci
- Porticus Octavia
- **Porticus Octaviae**
- Porticus Philippi
- Porticus Pompeii
- Porticus Vipsania

== Religious structures ==
=== Altars, shrines, and other sacred sites ===
- Altar of Consus
- Altar of Dis and Proserpina
- Altar of Domitius Ahenobarbus
- Altar of Saturn
- Altar of Victory
- Ara Fortunae Reducis
- **Ara Pacis**
- Ficus Ruminalis
- Great Altar of Hercules
- Lupercal
- Shrine of Opiconsivia
- Shrine of Venus Cloacina

=== Early Christian churches ===
- Sant'Agnese fuori le mura
- Sant'Anastasia al Palatino
- Santi Apostoli
- **Santa Balbina**
- Santa Bibiana
- Santa Cecilia in Trastevere
- **San Clemente**
- Santa Costanza
- Santa Croce in Gerusalemme
- **San Crisogono**
- Santi Cosma e Damiano
- Santi Giovanni e Paolo al Celio
- Saint John Lateran and the **Lateran Baptistry**
- San Lorenzo in Lucina
- San Lorenzo fuori le mura
- San Marcello al Corso
- San Marco
- San Martino ai Monti
- Santa Maria in Trastevere
- **Santa Maria Maggiore**
- Old St. Peter's Basilica
- San Paolo fuori le mura
- Santa Prassede
- Santa Pudenziana
- **Santa Sabina**
- San Pietro in Vincoli
- San Sebastiano fuori le mura
- Santa Susanna
- San Vitale

=== Temples (by regio) ===
==== Regio I Porta Capena ====
- Temple of Honor and Virtue
- Temple of Mars in Clivo
- Temple of Mars Gradivus
- Temple to the Tempestas

==== Regio II Caelimontium ====
- Temple of Claudius

==== Regio IV Templum Pacis ====
- **Temple of Antoninus and Faustina**
- **Temple of Caesar**
- Temple of Divus Augustus
- **Temple of Romulus**
- **Temple of Venus and Roma**

==== Regio V Esquiliae ====
- Lucus Mefitis
- Temple of Juno Lucina
- Temple of Minerva Medica and **nymphaeum**

==== Regio VI Alta Semita ====
- Temple of the gens Flavia
- Temple of Pudicitia Plebeia
- Temple of Quirinus
- Temple of Salus
- Temple of Serapis

==== Regio VII Via Lata ====
- Temple of Fortuna Muliebris

==== Regio VIII Forum Romanum ====
- **Temple of Castor and Pollux**
- Temple of Concord
- Temple of Fides
- Temple of Fortuna
- Temple of Janus
- Temple of Juno Moneta
- Temple of Jupiter Custos
- Temple of Jupiter Feretrius
- **Temple of Jupiter Optimus Maximus**
- Temple of Jupiter Tonans
- Temple of Mater Matuta
- **Temple of Mars Ultor**
- Temple of Minerva
- Temple of Ops
- **Temple of Peace**
- **Temple of Saturn**
- Temple of Trajan
- Temple of Veiovis
- **Temple of Venus Genetrix**
- **Temple of Vespasian and Titus**
- **Temple of Vesta**

==== Regio IX Circus Flaminius ====
- **Largo di Torre Argentina**
- **Pantheon**
- Temple of Apollo Sosianus
- Temple of Bellona
- Temple of Fortuna Equestris
- **Temple of Hadrian**
- Temple of Hercules Musarum
- Temple of Isis and Serapis
- Temple of Janus
- Temple of Juno Regina
- Temple of Juno Sospita
- Temple of Jupiter Stator
- Temple of Mars
- Temple of Matidia
- Temple of Minerva Chalcidica
- Temple of Neptune
- Temple of the Nymphs
- Temple of Piety
- Temple of Spes
- Temple of Vulcan

==== Regio X Palatium ====
- Elagabalium
- Temple of Apollo Palatinus
- Temple of Cybele
- Temple of Fortuna Respiciens
- Temple of Juno Sospita
- Temple of Victory

==== Regio XI Circus Maximus ====
- Temple of Ceres, Liber and Libera
- Temple of Hercules Pompeianus
- **Temple of Hercules Victor**
- **Temple of Portunus**
- Temple of Pudicitia Patricia
- Temple of Summanus
- Temple of Venus Obsequens

==== Regio XIII Aventinus ====
- Temple of Bona Dea
- Temple of Diana
- Temple of Juno Regina
- Temple of Luna
- Temple of Minerva

==== Regio XIV Transtiberim ====
- Temple of Asclepius
- Temple of Faunus

== Residences ==
=== Palaces ===
- **Domus Augustana**
- **Domus Augusti**
- **Domus Aurea**
- **Domus Flavia**
- Domus Severiana
- **Domus Tiberiana**
- **Domus Transitoria**
- **Palace of Domitian**
- Regia

=== Urban dwellings ===
- Casa Romuli
- Domus Valeriorum
- House of the Vestals
- **Insula dell'Ara Coeli**

=== Villas ===
- Horti Aciliorum
- Horti Agrippinae
- Horti Caesaris
- Horti Calyclani
- Horti Domitiae
- Horti Epaphroditiani
- Horti Lamiani
- Horti Liciniani
- Horti Lolliani
- Horti Lucullani
- Horti Maecenatis
- Horti Maiani
- Horti Pallantiani
- Horti Pompeiani
- **Horti Sallustiani**
- Horti Spei Veteris
- Horti Tauriani
- Horti Torquatiani
- **Villa Gordiani**
- **Villa of Maxentius**
- Villa delle Vignacce
- Villa of the Quintilii

== See also ==
- Topography of ancient Rome
- List of tourist attractions in Rome
