= Catacombs of Aproniano =

Catacomb in Rome, Italy

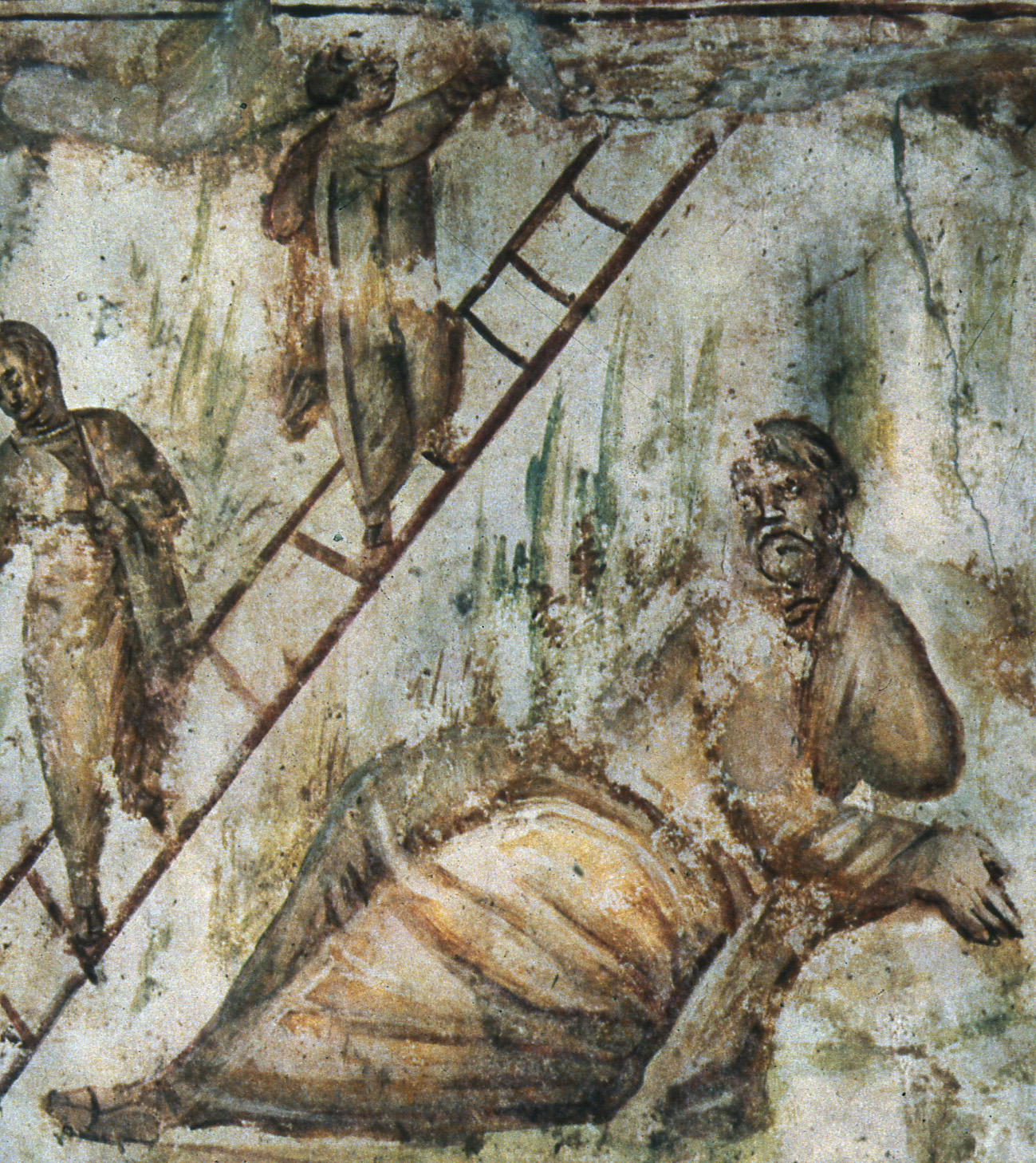
Fresco in the Catacomb of Apronianus or Catacomb of Via Latina, depicting Jacob's Ladder, according to the episode described in the Book of Genesis (28:11-19), referencing the dream of the patriarch Jacob fleeing from his brother Esau, with a ladder leading to Heaven

The Catacomb of Apronianus or Catacomb of Via Latina is a catacomb in Rome, located on Via Cesare Correnti, near Via Latina, in the modern district of Appio-Latino, southeast of Rome.

== History ==
The identification of this underground cemetery with that of Aproniano, mentioned by ancient sources, is attributed to Enrico Josi, although many scholars do not agree with this identification and prefer to designate the catacomb with the name of the street where it is located.

Apronianus was the owner of the land on which the cemetery was established. The catacomb was certainly visited by Antonio Bosio, who mentions it in his book Roma Sotterranea and describes a richly decorated architecture with funerary chapels adorned with frescoes and mosaics.

This catacomb, constructed on four levels, making it one of the largest and most audacious in Rome, has revealed two inscriptions dated AD 384 and 400.

Today, little remains of all its former richness. Excavations in the necropolis, rediscovered by Josi in 1937, did not yield significant results. They confirmed the presence of four levels and uncovered two inscriptions dated AD 371 and 372, suggesting that the catacomb dates to the second half of the 4th century. The oldest part is the second level, but the location of the original entrance is unknown.

The Itineraries of medieval pilgrimages, meant for pilgrims, mention the presence in this catacomb of the remains of several martyr saints: Eugenia, Nemesius the deacon, Olympus, Sempronianus, Theodulus, Superius, Oblotere, and Tiburticanus. The latter two and Nemesius are completely unknown in ancient liturgical sources. Information about Olympus, Sempronianus, Theodulus, and Superius is found only in the hagiographic legend of the martyr Stephen. The only martyr for whom some information is available is Eugenia of Rome, who is said to have died during the reign of emperors Valerian (253–260) and Gallienus (253–268), with her remains deposited in a chapel of the church dedicated to her on the right side of Via Latina. According to the Liber Pontificalis, in the 8th century, Popes John VII and Adrian I restored the church of Saint Eugenia and founded a convent nearby. Unfortunately, all the land above the catacomb was completely destroyed during construction work in the 20th century.

== See also ==
- List of extant papal tombs

== Bibliography ==
- Enrico Josi, Cimitero christiano sulla via Latina, in RAC 17, 1940, pp. 19–20 L. De Santis and G. Biamonte, Le catacombe di Roma, Newton & Compton Editori, Rome 1997, pp. 274–276
