= Temple of Faunus =

Ancient Roman temple

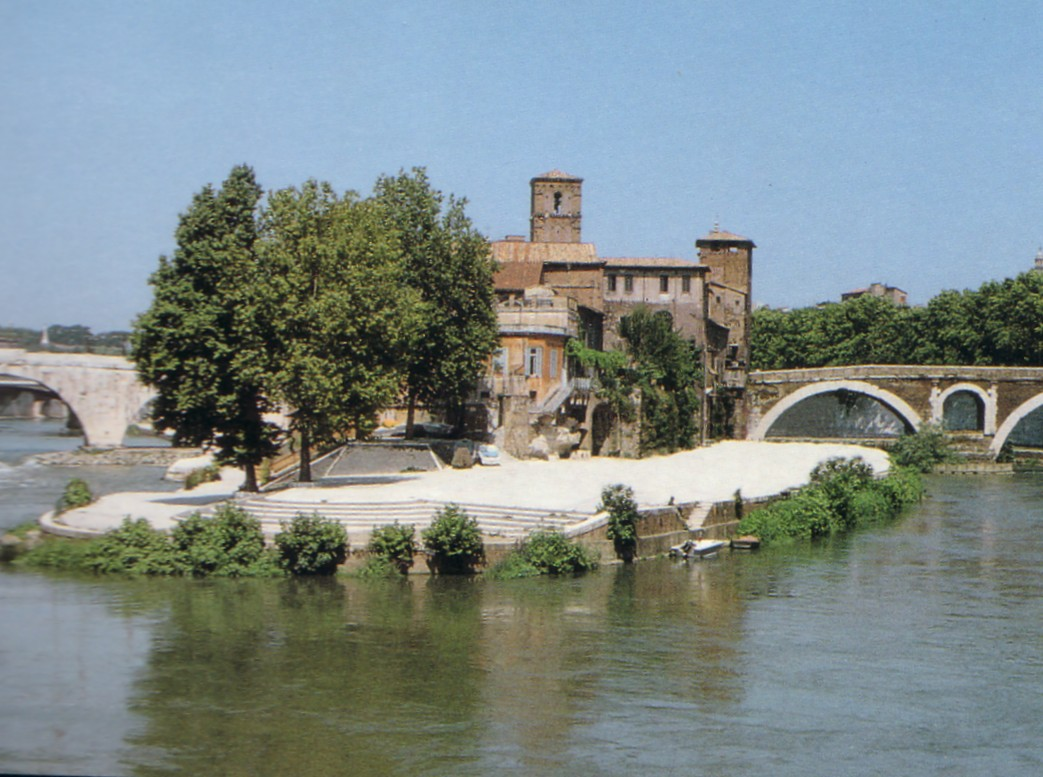
- Southern end of the Isola Tiberina, site of the temple of Faunus.

- Shown in ancient Rome
- Interactive map of Temple of Faunus
- 41°53′28″N 12°28′34″E

The Temple of Faunus (Latin: aedes Fauni) was an ancient Roman temple on the southern end of the Tiber Island in Rome, dedicated to Faunus, the god of flocks. It was the only temple with that dedication in Rome itself.

It was a hexastyle prostyle built in 196 BC by Gnaeus Domitius Ahenobarbus and Gaius Scribonius Libo and financed by a fine they had imposed on the shepherd of a flock which (probably) had accidentally grazed for free on a public field. It was dedicated in 194 BC on the Ides of February, anticipating by two days the major Roman festival of Faunus, the Lupercalia.

== See also ==
- List of Ancient Roman temples

== Bibliography ==
- Lawrence Richardson, Jr., "Fanus, Aedes", in A New Topographical Dictionary of Ancient Rome, JHU, Baltimore 1992, ISBN 0801843006, p. 148.
