= Cloaca Circi Maximi =

Sewer in ancient Rome

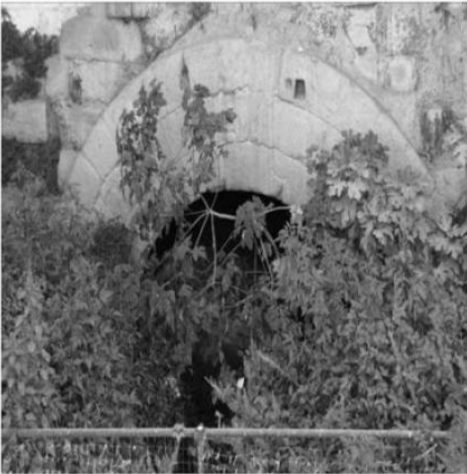
An outgate of the Cloaca Circi Maxmi

The Cloaca Circi Maximi or Cloaca Circi was one of the three main sewers in ancient Rome, alongside the Cloaca Maxima and Chiavicone dell'Olmo.

== History ==
The Cloaca Circi Maximi was built in the Augustan period, to clear Rome of unhealthy bodies of water. It was originally a small stream fed by various sources from around the Porta Capena right through the valley between the Palatine Hill and Aventine Hill, running down to the river Tiber. According to tradition, games and horse races were held in this valley from right after the founding of Rome in the 8th century.

Over the centuries, the Circus Maximus was built over the stream, with a channel named Euripus running across it halfway and two bridges carrying the track over it. This sewer would drain the area around the Circus Maximus. It also served as the spina down the middle of the track.

Under Julius Caesar and Augustus the circus and its surroundings were greatly enlarged, covering over the channel, which became a sewer. It was connected to a tunnel modelled on that of the Cloaca Maxima and now terminated on the Tiber upstream of the Cloaca Maxima.

Later in the sewer's history it was connected to culverts around the Colosseum and maybe the Baths of Caracalla.

The Torre della Moletta, or Tower of Moletta was built upon the ruins of the Cloaca Circi Maximi.

== Bibliography ==
- Evolution of Water Supply Through the Millennia, p 446 ISBN 9781843395409
- L. Richardson, jr, A New Topographical Dictionary of Ancient Rome, Baltimore - London 1992. pp.84. ISBN 0801843006
