= Porticus Margaritaria =

Coordinates: 41.8911°N 12.4878°E

The Porticus Margaritaria (Latin for the "Pearl-Sellers' Portico") was a portico in ancient Rome known only from the Notitia et Curiosum. The complex was seemingly commercial in nature as numerous inscriptions refer to jewelers (CIL VI.9207, 9221, 9239, 9418, 9419). It was most likely located outside of the Forum Romanum and adjacent to the House of Vestals. Directly across the Sacra Via was the Basilica Nova. To its south-east was the Temple of Venus and Roma and beyond that the Colosseum. Nothing remains of the Porticus Margaritaria except for some sections of foundation and ruins. Jordan (I.2.476) placed the porticus on the boundary of Region VIII, between the Forum Boarium and the Forum Holitorium.
