= Regio VIII Forum Romanum =

Historical region of Rome

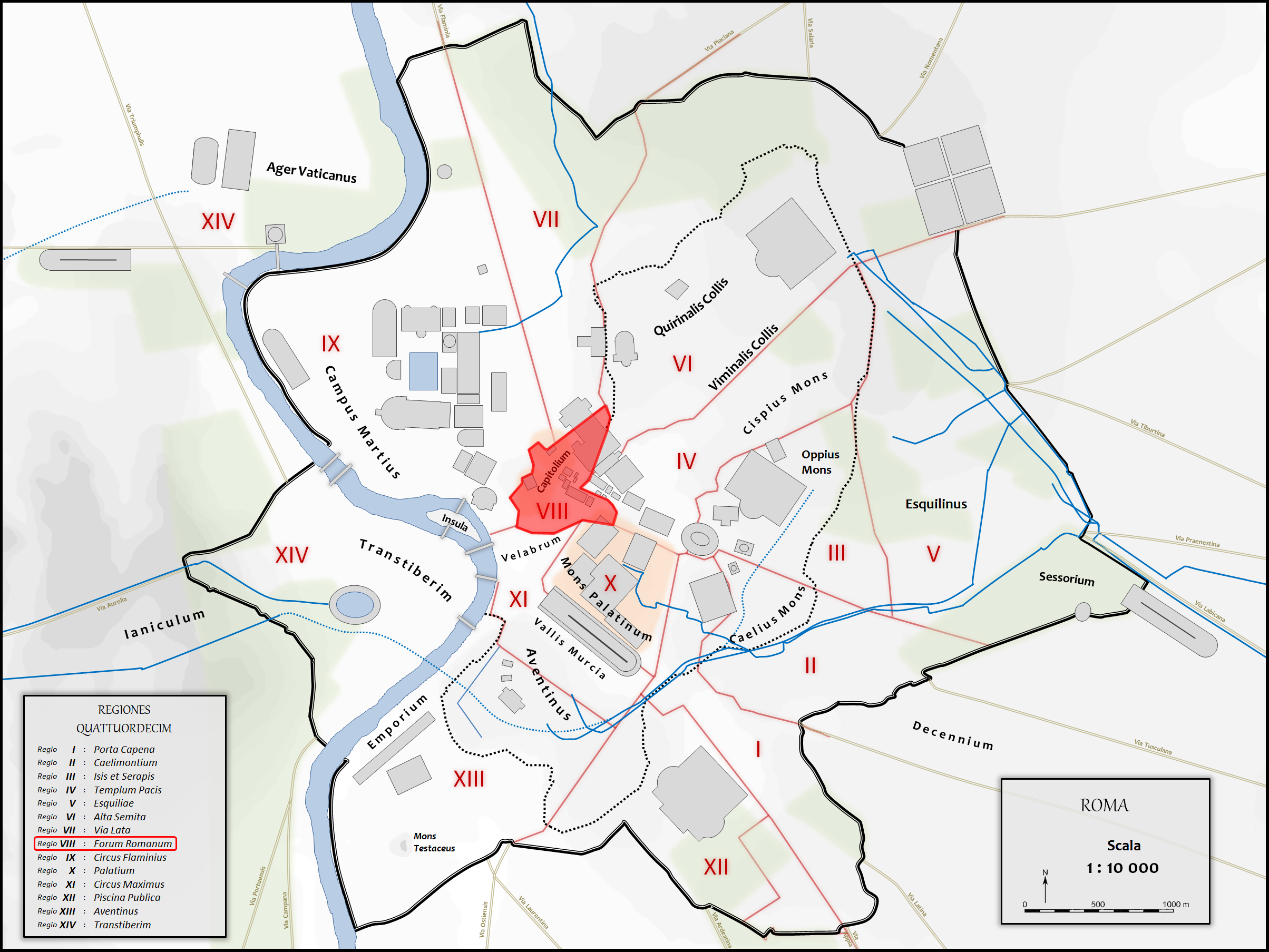

The Regio VIII Forum Romanum Magnum is the eighth regio of imperial Rome, under Augustus's administrative reform. Regio VIII took its name from the Roman Forum, the political centre of Ancient Rome.

== Geographic extent and important features ==
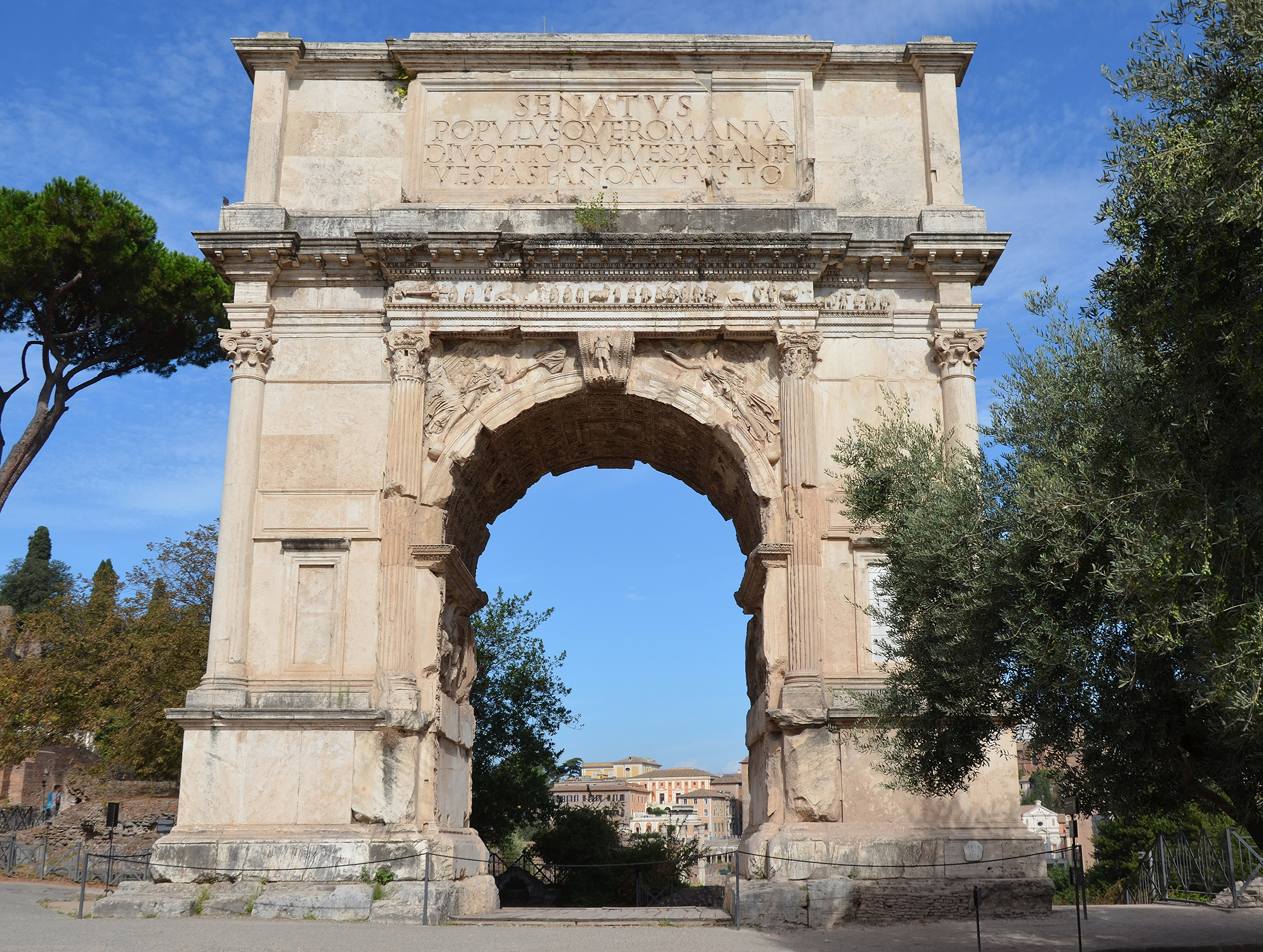
The Arch of Titus

Regio VIII was the central region of Rome, both geographically and politically. In extent, the region was bordered by the Servian Wall to its northeast and the Palatine Hill to the southeast, while the western outcrop of the Quirinal Hill and the Via Sacra formed its eastern boundaries. It therefore included the Capitoline Hill, the valley between the Palatine and the Capitoline hills (where the Roman Forum is nestled), and the area between Velian Hill and the Palatine just before the point where the Arch of Titus straddles the Via Sacra. A measurement taken at the end of the 4th century recorded that the perimeter of the region was 13,067 Roman feet (approximately 3.86 km).

The region was dominated by the massive sanctuary of Rome that sat on the crown of the Capitoline, the Temple of Jupiter Optimus Maximus. Known as the Golden Capitol, the temple's roof was covered with gilt metal tiles, the bases and capitals of its columns were gilt, as were the gates, and it was decorated with gilt statues and monuments. Descending by the Clivus Capitolinus, on this stretch of road were the Temples of Concord, Saturn, and Vespasian and Titus. On the slope of the Capitoline, below the Temple of Jupiter stood the Tabularium, while close by the Temple of Concord stood the temple dedicated to the Genius Populi Romani which itself stood adjacent to the most ancient of the three Rostra that were erected at various points across the Forum.

This part of the Forum also contained the Arch of Tiberius (no longer in existence) and the still standing Arch of Septimius Severus. Next to, or on top of this arch, stood the bronze equestrian statue of Constantine I, which was probably removed from Rome during the visit by the Byzantine Emperor Constans II in 663. It was also near this arch that Augustus set up the Milliarium Aureum (or Golden Milestone), and the Umbilicus urbis Romae stood. Adjacent to these stood the Curia Julia (or Senate House), built by Julius Caesar and subsequently restored by Domitian.

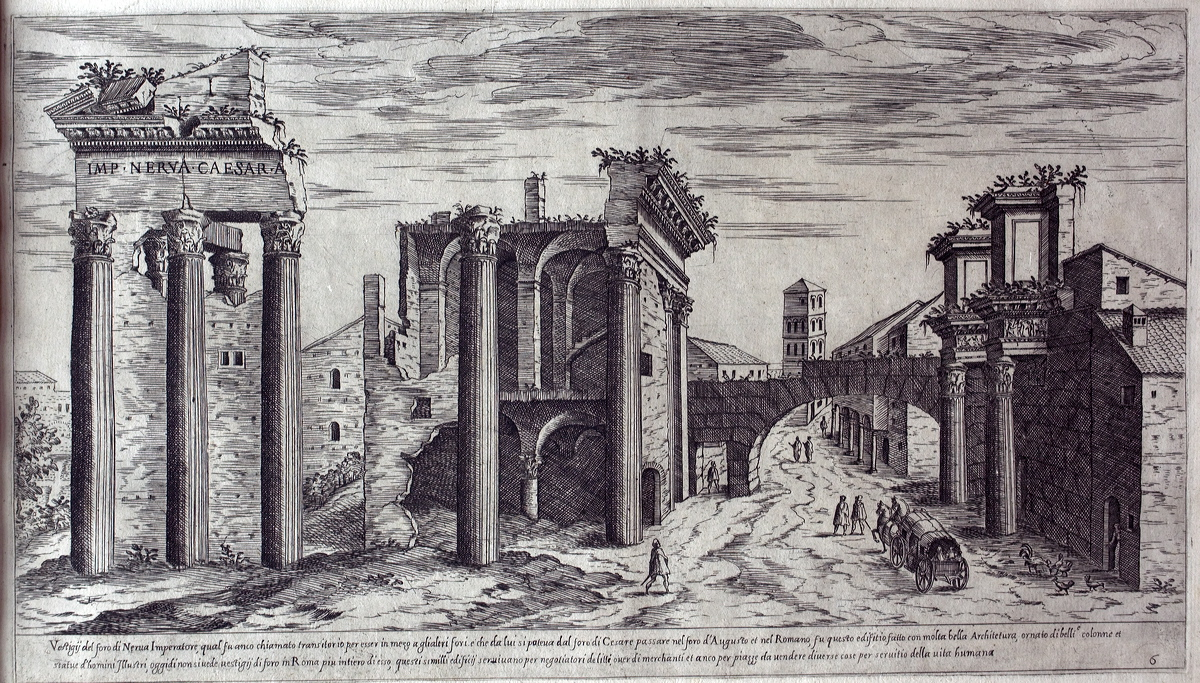
Drawing of the ruins of the Forum of Nerva (1575)

Beside the Curia Julia along the Argiletum stood the Temple of Janus Geminus. Further along stood the Basilica Argentaria, and although beside it stood the Basilica Aemilia, the Aemilia formed part of the fourth region. Across the Forum on its southern side facing the Aemilia was the Basilica Julia, rebuilt by Diocletian after a fire destroyed the earlier structure. This part of the Forum contained the Vicus Jugarius, the Graecostasis, the Temple of Castor and Pollux and the Temple of Vesta. The southern portion of the region then terminated at the Arch of Augustus.

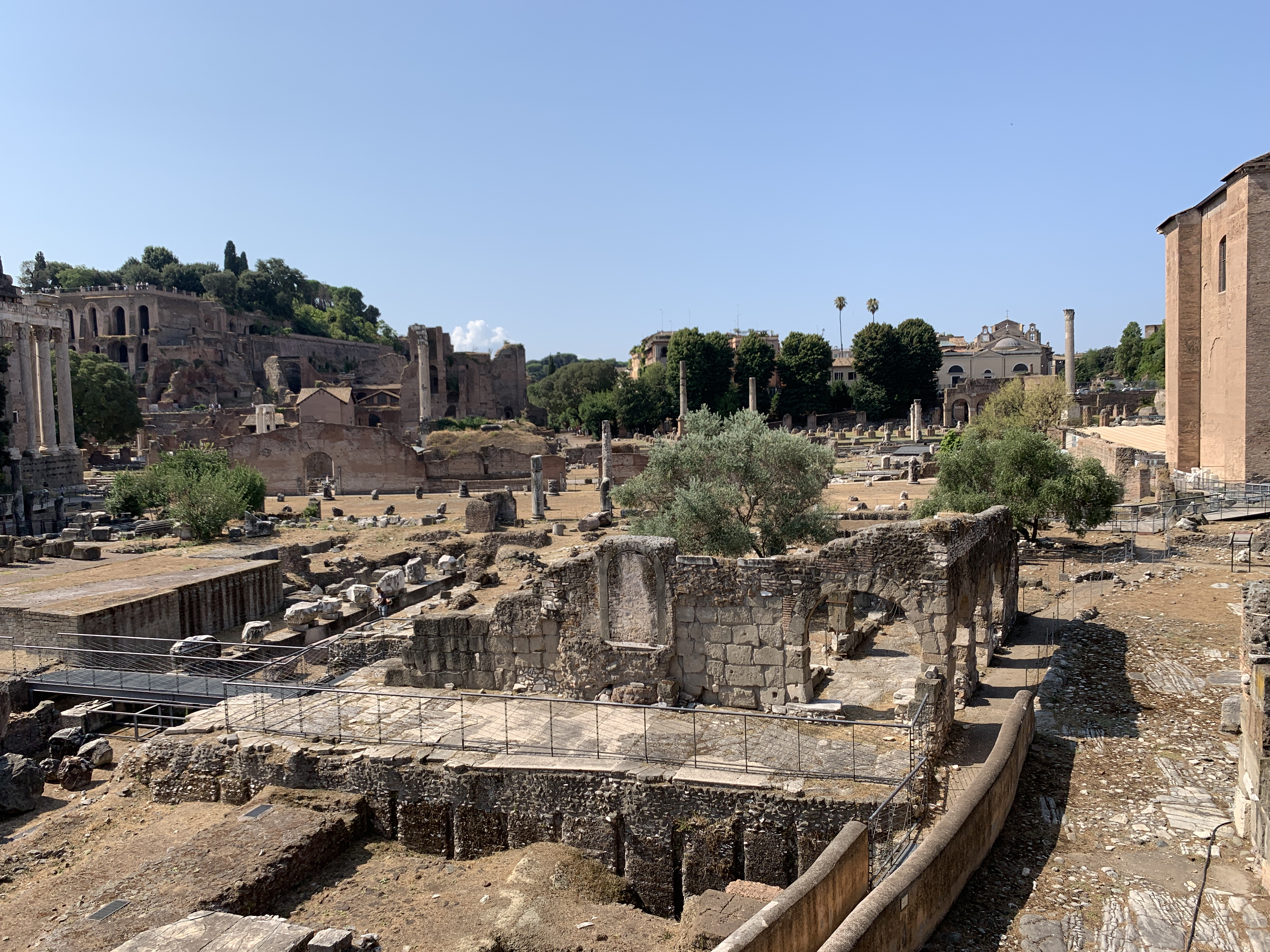
The ruins of the Forum of Nerva

Moving north from the Arch of Septimius Severus, the region contained the collective Imperial Fora, a series of monumental public squares. They were four in number, the Forums of Caesar, Augustus, Nerva and Trajan. The Forum of Caesar contained the Temple of Venus Genetrix, with an equestrian statue of Julius Caesar standing in front of the temple. The Forum of Augustus contained the Temple of Mars Ultor, while the Forum of Nerva contained the Temple of Minerva. The Forum of Trajan, which apart from the still standing Column of Trajan which dominated the open space, also contained an equestrian statue of Trajan, while the buildings contained an enormous library. Around the open space stood the statues of the great philosophers, poets and rhetoricians, which continued to be added to. In the fifth century, statues of Claudian and Sidonius Apollinaris were included in the Forum of Trajan.

This region also included the Porticus margaritaria, as well as the sixth cohort of the Vigiles. At the turn of the 5th century, the Regio contained 34 aediculae (shrines), 130 domūs (patrician houses), 18 horrea (warehouses), 85 balneae (bath houses) and 120 loci (fountains).

== Subdivisions ==
At the turn of the 5th century, the Regio was divided into 34 vici (districts) and 3,480 insulae (blocks). It had two curators and was served by 48 Roman magistrates.
