= Arch of Pietas =

Lost ancient Roman arch near the Pantheon

The Arch of Pietas (Latin: Arcus Pietatis) is the name of a lost Roman monumental arch in the northern Campus Martius in Rome. It is generally placed north or northeast of the Pantheon, although its precise location, date, and function are uncertain. The arch is known principally from medieval descriptions of Rome.

== Medieval attestations ==
The Mirabilia Urbis Romae associates an Arcus Pietatis with the Temple of Hadrian and Santa Maria in Aquiro. The 15th-century Tractatus de Rebus Antiquis et Situ Urbis Romae places an arch of that name before Sancta Maria Rotunda, the medieval name of the Pantheon, in the direction of Santa Maria Maddalena. It has also been associated with the Actian Arch of Augustus mentioned in De mirabilibus urbis Romae.

The references may not all concern the same monument. During the Middle Ages, the name Arcus Pietatis was applied to several ancient arches, including the Arch of Titus, making the identification of the Pantheon-area arch uncertain.

== Location and identification ==
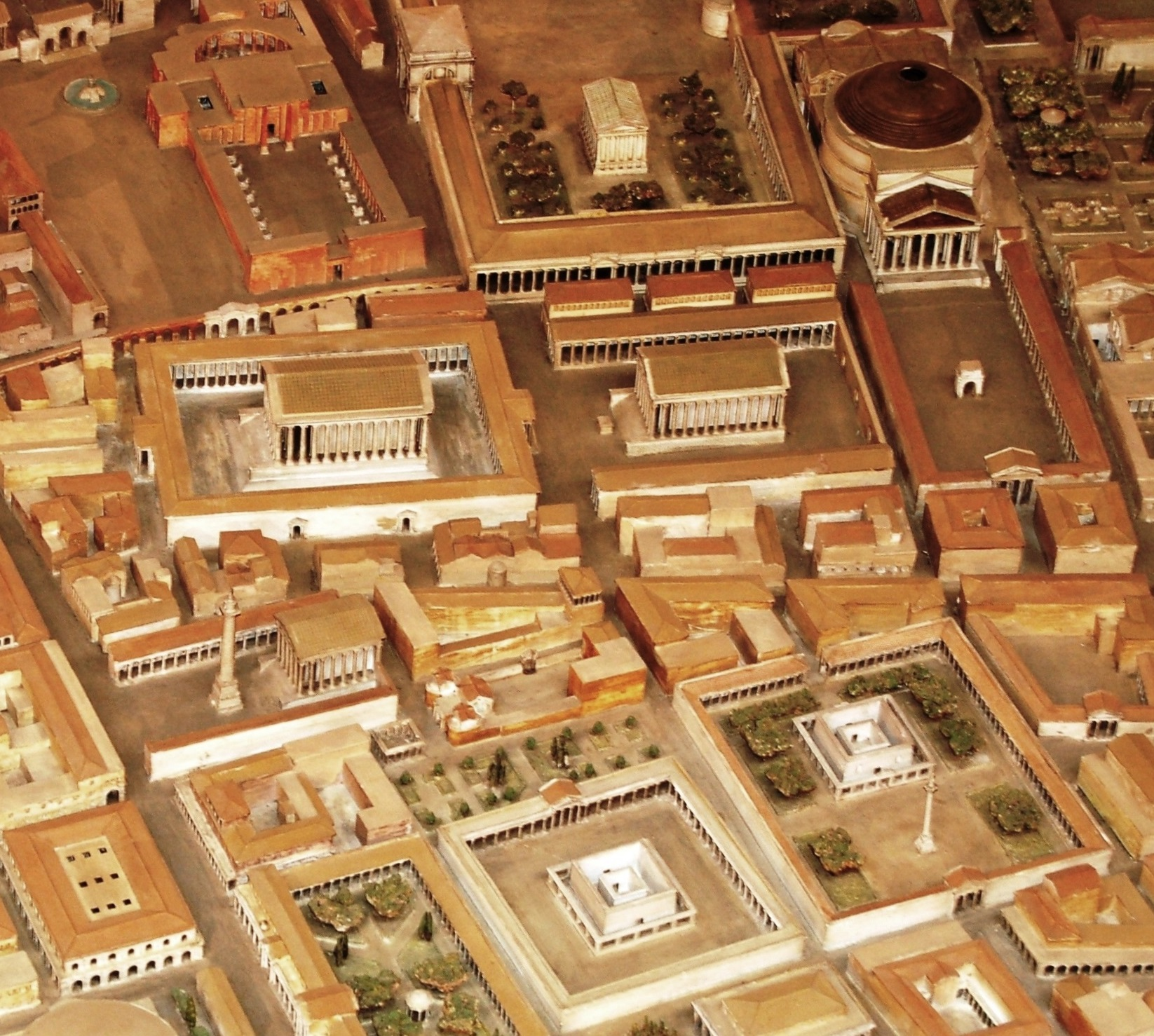
Arch placed in the Pantheon's forecourt (top right), in Italo Gismondi's model.

The arch may have formed a monumental entrance to one of the adjoining precincts of the Pantheon, the Temple of Matidia or the Temple of Hadrian. Christian Hülsen placed it northeast of the Pantheon, near Santa Maria Maddalena, where it may have connected the Pantheon forecourt with the precinct of the Temple of Matidia.

Rodolfo Lanciani instead placed it directly in the Pantheon forecourt in his Forma Urbis Romae. This position was adopted in several later reconstructions, but a freestanding arch in the center of the forecourt would be unusual, since Roman arches generally marked a thoroughfare or an entrance between distinct spaces. Lanciani also associated the arch with a large marble base reportedly found during work carried out under Pope Alexander VII. According to Pietro Santi Bartoli, the marble block was discovered in the cellar of a house and later reused to form bases for two restored columns in the Pantheon's portico. Bartoli did not identify it as part of an arch, and it may instead have belonged to an altar or another monument in the forecourt.

== See also ==
- Piazza della Rotonda
- List of Roman triumphal arches
- List of ancient monuments in Rome
