= List of Roman triumphal arches =

This is a list of Roman triumphal arches. Triumphal arches were constructed across the Roman Empire and are an archetypal example of Roman architecture. Most surviving Roman arches date from the Imperial period (1st century BC onwards). They were preceded by honorific arches set up under the Roman Republic.

== Existing arches ==
Image	Name	Date	Modern city	Modern country	Ancient name
	Arch of Caracalla	216 AD	Djémila	Algeria	Cuicul, Curculum
	Arch of Caracalla	211–214 AD	Tébessa	Algeria	Theveste
	Arch of Trajan	c. 2nd or 3rd centuries AD	Timgad	Algeria	Marciana Traiana Thamugadi
	Arch of Marcus Aurelius (Markouna)	c. 2nd AD	Tazoult	Algeria	Verecunda
	Heidentor	354–361 AD	Petronell-Carnuntum	Austria	Carnuntum
	Arch of the Sergii	29–27 BC	Pula	Croatia	Colonia Pietas Iulia Pola Pollentia Herculanea
	Arch of Campanus	1st century AD	Aix-les-Bains	France	Aquae Gratianae
	Porte Noire	c. 171–175 AD	Besançon	France	Vesontio
	Arch of Carpentras	18–19 AD	Carpentras	France	Carpentoracte Meminorum, Forum Neronis
	Triumphal Arch of Orange	c. 20–27 AD	Orange	France	Colonia Julia Firma Secundanorum Arausio
	Porte de Mars	3rd century AD	Reims	France	Durocortorum
	Pont Flavien	c. 12 BC	Saint-Chamas	France	n/a
	Arch of Glanum	10–25 AD	Saint-Rémy-de-Provence	France	Glanum
	Arch of Germanicus	18–19 AD	Saintes	France	Mediolanum Santonum
	Arch of Hadrian	131–132 AD	Athens	Greece	Athína, Athenae
	Arch of Galerius	298–299 AD	Thessaloniki	Greece	Thessaloníkē
	Arch of Trajan	113 AD	Ancona	Italy	Ancona
	Arch of Augustus	25 BC	Aosta	Italy	Augusta Praetoria Salassorum
	Arch of Mark Antony	113 AD	Aquino	Italy	Aquinum
	Arch of Trajan	114–117 AD	Benevento	Italy	Maleventum, Beneventum
	Arch of Trajan	c. 109 AD	Canosa di Puglia	Italy	Canusium
	Arch of Hadrian	c. 1st or 2nd centuries AD	Capua	Italy	Capuae
	Arch of Augustus	9 AD	Fano	Italy	Fanum Fortunae
	Arch of Tiberius	18–19 AD	Pompei	Italy	Pompeii
	Arch of Augustus	c. 36–29 BC	Rome	Italy	Roma
	Arch of Constantine	312–315 AD	Rome	Italy	Roma
	Arch of Drusus	9 BC	Rome	Italy	Roma
	Arch of Dativius Victor	Mid-3rd century AD	Mainz	Germany	Mogontiacum
	Arch of Gallienus	262 AD	Rome	Italy	Roma
	Arch of Janus	4th century AD	Rome	Italy	Roma
	Arch of Septimius Severus	203 AD	Rome	Italy	Roma
	Arch of Titus	82 AD	Rome	Italy	Roma
	Arch of Drusus	14–37 AD	Spoleto	Italy	Spoletium
	Arch of Augustus	8 BC	Susa	Italy	Segusio
	Arco di Riccardo	33 BC	Trieste	Italy	Tergeste, Tergestum
	Arco dei Gavi	c. 50 AD	Verona	Italy	Verona
	Arch of Hadrian	129–130 AD	Jerash	Jordan	Gerasa
	Arch of Hadrian	2nd century AD	Tyre	Lebanon	Tyros, Tyrus
	Arch of Tiberius	35 AD	Khoms	Libya	Leptis Magna
	Arch of Trajan	109–110 AD	Khoms	Libya	Leptis Magna
	Arch of Septimius Severus	146–211 AD	Khoms	Libya	Leptis Magna
	Arch of Marcus Aurelius	165 AD	Tripoli	Libya	Oea
	Arch of Caracalla	217 AD	Volubilis	Morocco	Volubilis
	Arch of Cabanes	c. 2nd century AD	Castellón de la Plana	Spain	n/a
	Arco de Medinaceli	c. 1st century BC	Medinaceli	Spain	Occilis, Okilis
	Arc de Berà	c. 13 BC	Roda de Berà	Spain	n/a
	Latakia Tetraporticus (Arch of Septimius Severus)	183 AD	Latakia	Syria	Laodicea ad Mare
	Arch of Alexander Severus	228 AD	Dougga	Tunisia	Colonia Licinia Septimia Aurelia Alexandriana Thuggensis
	Arch of Septimius Severus	200 AD	Dougga	Tunisia	Colonia Licinia Septimia Aurelia Alexandriana Thuggensis
	Triumphal Arch of the Tetrarchy	~300 AD	Sbeitla	Tunisia	Sufetula
	South Gate	c. 2nd or 3rd centuries AD	Anazarbus	Turkey	Anazarbos
	Hadrian's Gate	2nd century AD	Antalya	Turkey	Attaleia
	Ecce Homo arch	2nd century AD	Jerusalem	Israel	Aelia Capitolina

== Destroyed arches ==
Note: MUR stands for the 12th century Mirabilia Urbis Romae

Image	Name	Date of construction	Date destroyed	Modern city	Modern country	Notes	Citation
	Arch of Scipio	190 B.C.E.		Rome	Italy	Scipio Africanus	
	Arch of Arcadius, Honorius and Theodosius	405 AD	1362–1370	Rome	Italy		MUR, p. 10.
	Arch of Augustus	29 BC		Rome	Italy	Some fragments survive	
	Arch of Claudius	51–52 AD		Rome	Italy	Some fragments survive	MUR, p. 12.
	Arch of Faustinus		After 12th century	Rome	Italy		MUR, p. 13.
	Arch of Gratian, Valentinian and Theodosius	379–383 AD	c. 13th century	Rome	Italy		MUR, p. 10.
	Arch of Lentulus and Crispinus	2nd century AD	15th century	Rome	Italy		
	Arch Manus Carnae (Hand of Flesh)		After 12th century	Rome	Italy		MUR, p. 13.
	Arch of Nero	58–62 AD	c. 1st century AD	Rome	Italy		
	Arcus Novus	293–304 AD	1491	Rome	Italy	Some reliefs survive	
	Arch of Octavian or Marcus Aurelius		After 12th century	Rome	Italy		MUR, p. 12.
	Arch of Octavius	c. 28 BC		Rome	Italy		
	Arch Panis Aurei or Aureus (Golden)		After 12th century	Rome	Italy		MUR, p. 13.
	Arch of Pietas		After 12th century	Rome	Italy		MUR, p. 13.
	Arch of Portugal	c. 3rd century AD	1662	Rome	Italy	Some reliefs preserved at the Capitoline Museums	MUR, p. 10.
	Arch of Tiberius	16 AD		Rome	Italy	Some foundations still survive	
	Arch of Titus	81 AD	After 15th century	Rome	Italy	Some fragments still survive	MUR, p. 11.
	Monumental Arch	3rd century AD	October 2015	Palmyra	Syria	Most of the stonework is still intact	
	Arch of Theodosius	393 AD	6th–8th centuries	Istanbul	Turkey	Some fragments still survive	
	Arch at Richborough Castle	c. 1st century AD		Richborough	United Kingdom	Foundations and mound still visible	

== See also ==
- List of post-Roman triumphal arches
- Victory column
- Rostral column
- Roman architecture
- Roman engineering
- Roman technology

== Sources ==
- Mirabilia Urbis Romae [Marvels of Rome or a Picture of the Golden City]. Translated by Francis Morgan Nichols. London; Rome: Ellis and Elvey, Spithoever. 1889.
