= Arch of Trajan (Canosa) =

Ancient Roman triumphal arch

Coordinates: 41.2275°N 16.0463°E

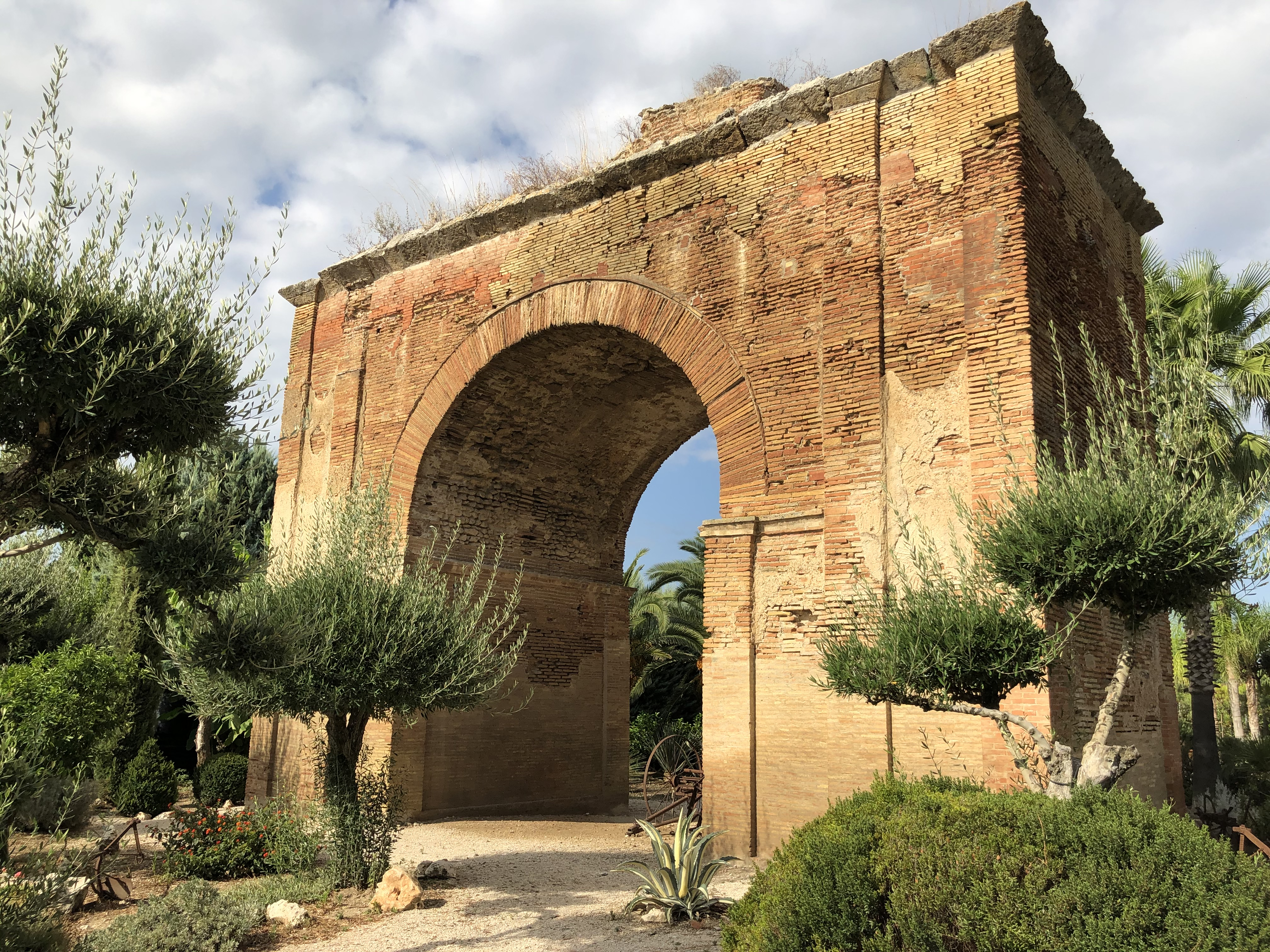
Arch of Trajan, Canosa

The Arch of Trajan (also called Porta Romana, Porta Varrone, and Varrense) is a Roman triumphal arch from the first half of the second century, located in Canosa di Puglia (Ancient Canusium, now in the Province of Barletta-Andria-Trani). The arch stands on the route of the ancient Via Traiana.

== History ==
The arch, considered to be from roughly the time of Trajan, had been dated to 109, on the hypothesis that its construction occurred during the production of the Via Traiana (108–110). Other scholars have preferred to date it to the reign of Hadrian.

It is also known as the Porta Varrone or Porta Varrense. This name derives from a traditional scholarly attribution of the arch to Gaius Terentius Varro, one of the Roman Consuls defeated in the Battle of Cannae in 216 BC.

It was restored several times in the nineteenth century and in 1911, with large amounts of modern reconstruction incorporated into it.

== Description ==
The arch, which has a single vault, was built of brick and probably coated in marble originally. It is now partially buried, but must have reached a height of about 13 metres, a width of 12 metres and a depth of 5 meters.

There are lesenes on the external corners of the pylons and in the middle of the front side of each of the pylons. These must have supported an entablature.

A fragment of marble relief from the decoration of the arch is kept in the Museo diocesano in Trani, which probably depicts a Dacian, and was found among the spolia in the crypt of the Church of Santa Maria de Russis. There is also a fragment of the frieze, also in marble, reused in the Castel del Monte, depicting a military scene; both reliefs are datable to the reign of Trajan.

== See also ==
- List of Roman triumphal arches
- Arch of Trajan (Benevento)

== Bibliography ==
- Silvio De Maria, Gli archi onorari di Roma e dell'Italia romana, Roma 1988, pp. 151, 163, 171–172, 236–237.
- M. Modugno, "L'arco onorario", in Raffaella Cassano (a cura di), Principi, imperatori, vescovi. Duemila anni di storia a Canosa, Venezia 1992, pp. 720–721.
- Luigi Todisco, "Rilievi romani a Trani, Castel del Monte, Canosa", in Mélanges de l'École française de Rome, 105, 1993, pp. 873–894.
- Pierre Gros, L'architettura romana dagli inizi del III secolo a.C. alla fine dell'alto impero. I monumenti pubblici, Milano 2001(edizione italiana), p. 83.
