= Arch of Scipio =

Ancient Roman arch

The Arch of Scipio (Latin: Fornix Scipionis) was an ancient Roman arch located atop the Capitoline Hill.

Completed in 190 BCE by Scipio Africanus immediately prior to his departure for the Roman–Seleucid War, the arch commemorated his victory over Hannibal at the Battle of Zama in 201 BCE. Delayed as a result of pressure brought about by Scipio’s political enemies, upon completion it was used by Scipio to bolster his demand that he accompany his brother, the consul Lucius Cornelius Scipio Asiaticus, to face Hannibal again, which culminated in their victory at the Battle of Magnesia. Able to be seen from the Roman Forum below, the arch stood at the entrance of the Area Capitolina and formed the entryway to the courtyard before the Temple of Jupiter Optimus Maximus. It faced the Clivus Capitolinus, in that to reach the arch, the approaching pathway turned right from the end of the ascending clivus.

A single fornix arch, it was adorned with two horses and seven gilded statues, while in front stood two marble basins. The statues most likely sat atop the arch, and have been speculated to have been either representation of the gods (in order to win their favour prior to the upcoming campaign against King Antiochus III and Hannibal), or the immediate family or possibly the ancestors of Scipio. The horses may have been equestrian, and not just of riderless horses. If so, then it is probable that the mounted men were Scipio’s father Publius Cornelius Scipio and his uncle Gnaeus Cornelius Scipio Calvus, both of whom died in Spain during the Second Punic War. With respect to the two marble basins, although water was present atop the Capitoline in cisterns and wells, it is most likely that the basins were originally ornamental prior to their being made into fountains with the establishment of the Aqua Marcia aqueduct in 140 BCE.

Nothing remains of the Arch of Scipio; it is possible that it no longer existed by the time of Livy. Had it survived antiquity, it may be that it is the arch on the Capitoline referred to as the arcus Panis Aurei in Capitolio in the 12th century manuscript Mirabilia Urbis Romae. Nevertheless, it would have been certainly destroyed during the 16th century at the same time as the remains of the Temple of Jupiter Optimus Maximus were demolished to make way for the Palazzo Caffarelli.

== Sources ==
- Richardson, L. A New Topographical Dictionary of Ancient Rome (1992), The Johns Hopkins University Press
- Ridley, Ronald T. The Arch of Scipio Africanus. Classical Philology, vol. 109, no. 1, 2014, pp. 11–25. JSTOR, https://doi.org/10.1086/673848. Accessed 13 Dec. 2022.
