= Arch of Lentulus and Crispinus =

Triumphal arch in Rome

Coordinates: 41.8866°N 12.4801°E

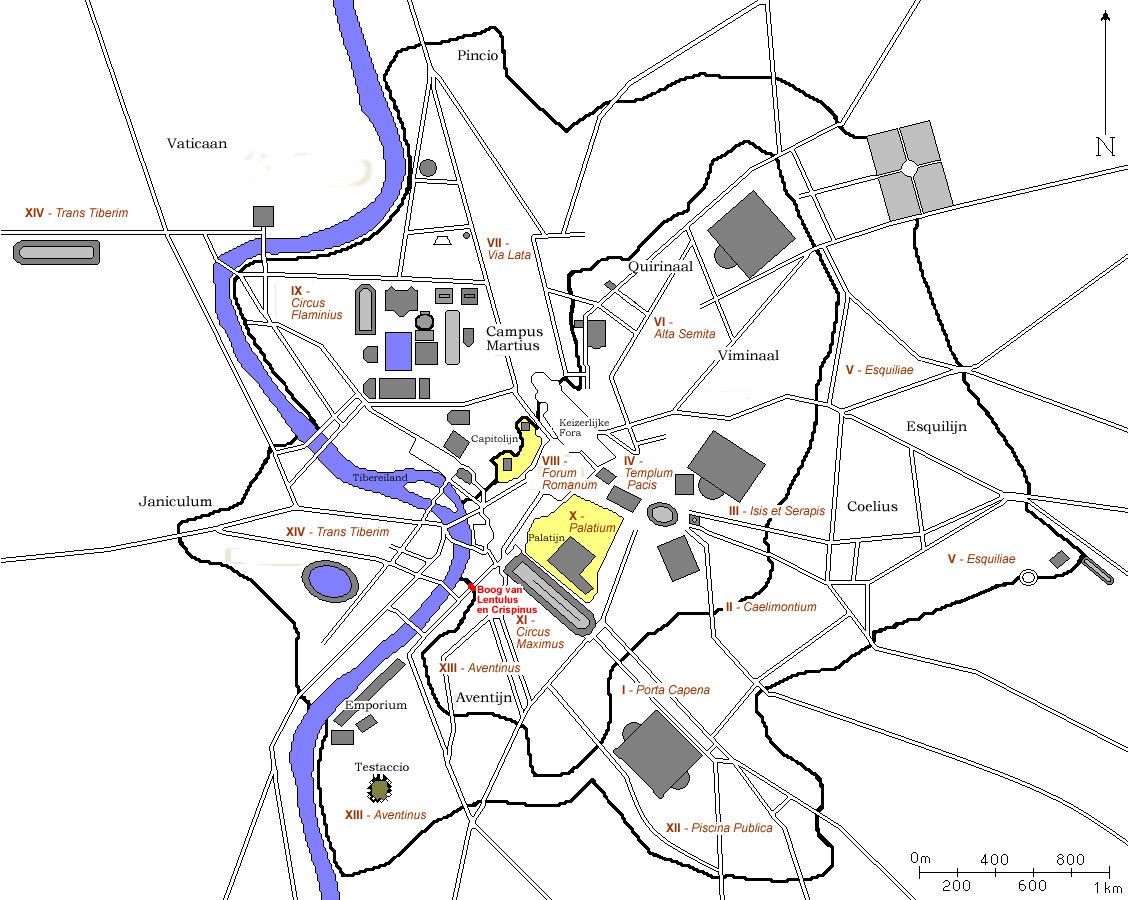
Arch of Lentulus and Crispinus on a map of ancient Rome around 300 AD

The Arch of Lentulus and Crispinus (Latin: Arcus Lentuli et Crispini) was a triumphal arch in Rome, sited between the Porta Trigemina of the Servian Wall and the statio Annonae, to the south of the Forum Boarium, near the carceres of the Circus Maximus.

It was built by the consuls Titus Quinctius Crispinus Sulpicianus and Lucius Cornelius Lentulus in the 2nd century AD. It was probably built as part of the renovation project launched by Augustus, as also seen in the arch of Dolabella and Silanus. It seems that this vault served as an arcade to the Aqua Appia or to the Aqua Marcia and that it was destroyed around the mid-15th century.

== See also ==
- List of Roman triumphal arches
- List of ancient monuments in Rome
