= Arch of Nero =

Triumphal arch of Ancient Rome

Coordinates: 41.8934°N 12.4830°E

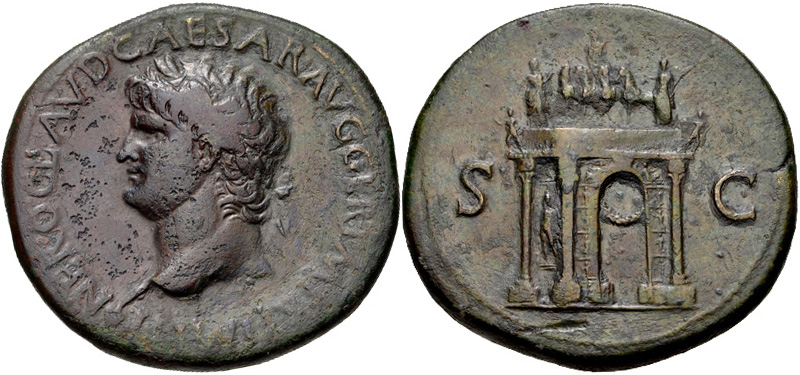
Nero. AD 54–68. Æ Sestertius (36mm, 26.67 g, 6h). Lugdunum (Lyon) mint. Struck circa AD 65

Arch of Nero (Latin: Arcus Neronis) is a now lost triumphal arch dedicated to the Roman emperor Nero that was located in Rome, Italy.

The arch was erected in the years between AD 58 and 62 and was designed to commemorate victories won by Gnaeus Domitius Corbulo in Parthia (Tacitus Annales 13.41; 15.18). Located on the slope of the Capitoline Hill in a locality referred to as inter duos lucos, the arch is known from coin representations, in which it appears as an arch with a single bay surmounted by a quadriga.

The arch likely was destroyed soon after Nero's death in A.D. 68.

== See also ==
- List of Roman triumphal arches
- List of ancient monuments in Rome
