= Praetorians Relief =

Roman marble sculpture

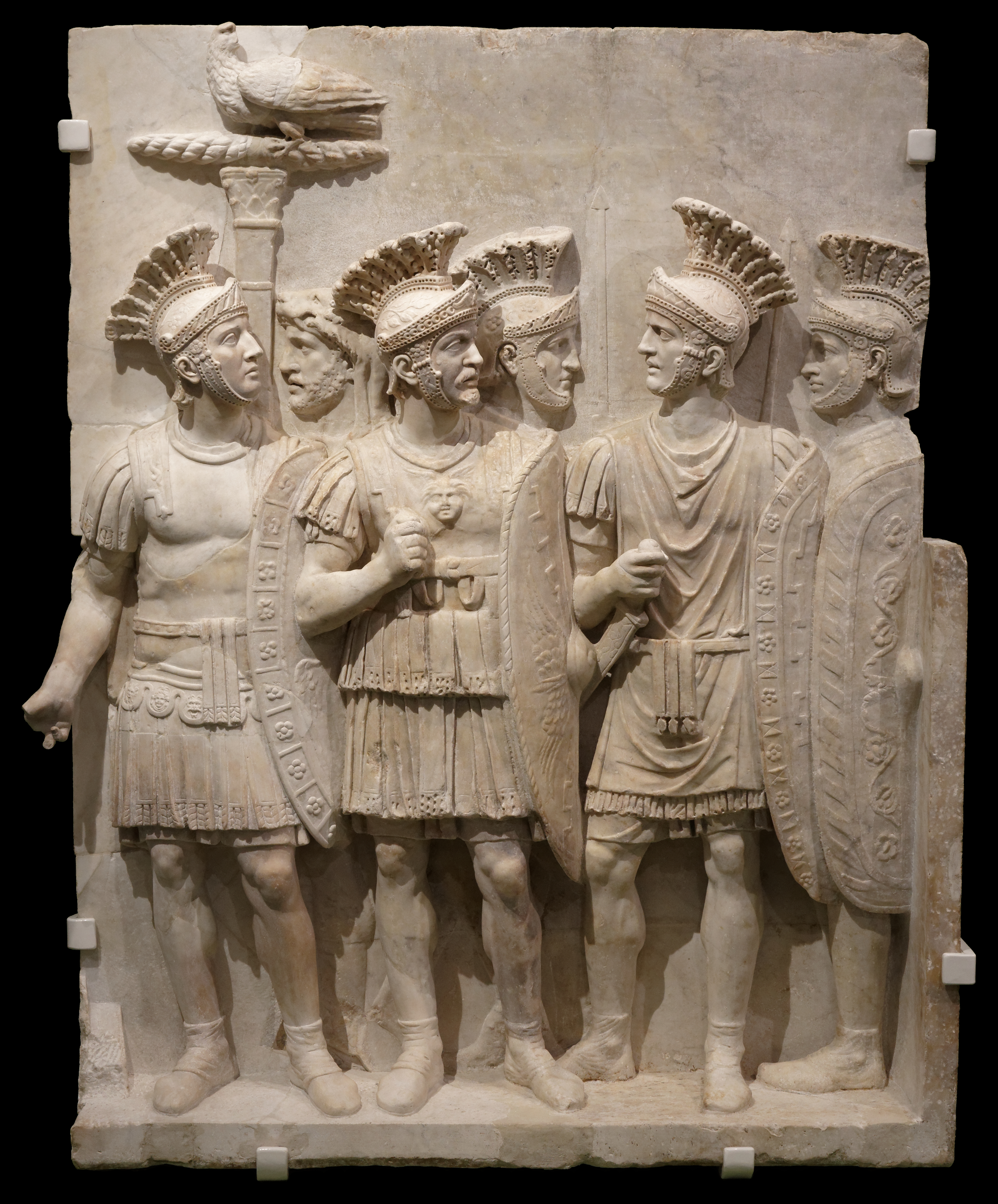
- Artist: Unknown
- Year: c. 51–52 AD
- Type: High relief, bas-relief
- Medium: marble
- Dimensions: 163 cm (64 in) × 134 cm (53 in) × 28 cm (11 in)
- Condition: Extant
- Location: Louvre-Lens, France
- Collection: Department of Greek, Etruscan, and Roman Antiquities of the Louvre
- Accession no.: Ma 1079

The Praetorians Relief is a Roman marble relief dated to c. 51–52 AD from the Arch of Claudius in Rome, now housed in the Louvre-Lens.

It depicts three soldiers in high relief in the foreground, while two others in the background, accompanied by a standard bearer, are made in bas-relief. The standard-bearer holds an aquila standard, where the eagle grasps a thunderbolt in its talons. The soldiers have been identified as Praetorians due to the richness of the apparel, particularly the helmets, the ceremonial dress and oval shields. The figures are wearing calcei and not caligae, worn by ordinary soldiers. However, according to Boris Rankov, "the Attic-style helmets are almost certainly an artistic convention". Rankov suggests that "early in their history the Praetorians were still using the Montefortino-style helmet normal in the legions of the Republic and early Empire".

The relief was previously dated to the early 2nd century AD. The lower half of the left-hand figure, portions of the middle two and the heads of all three foreground figures are modern restorations. In 2006 the relief underwent restoration by N. Imbert and A. Méthivier.

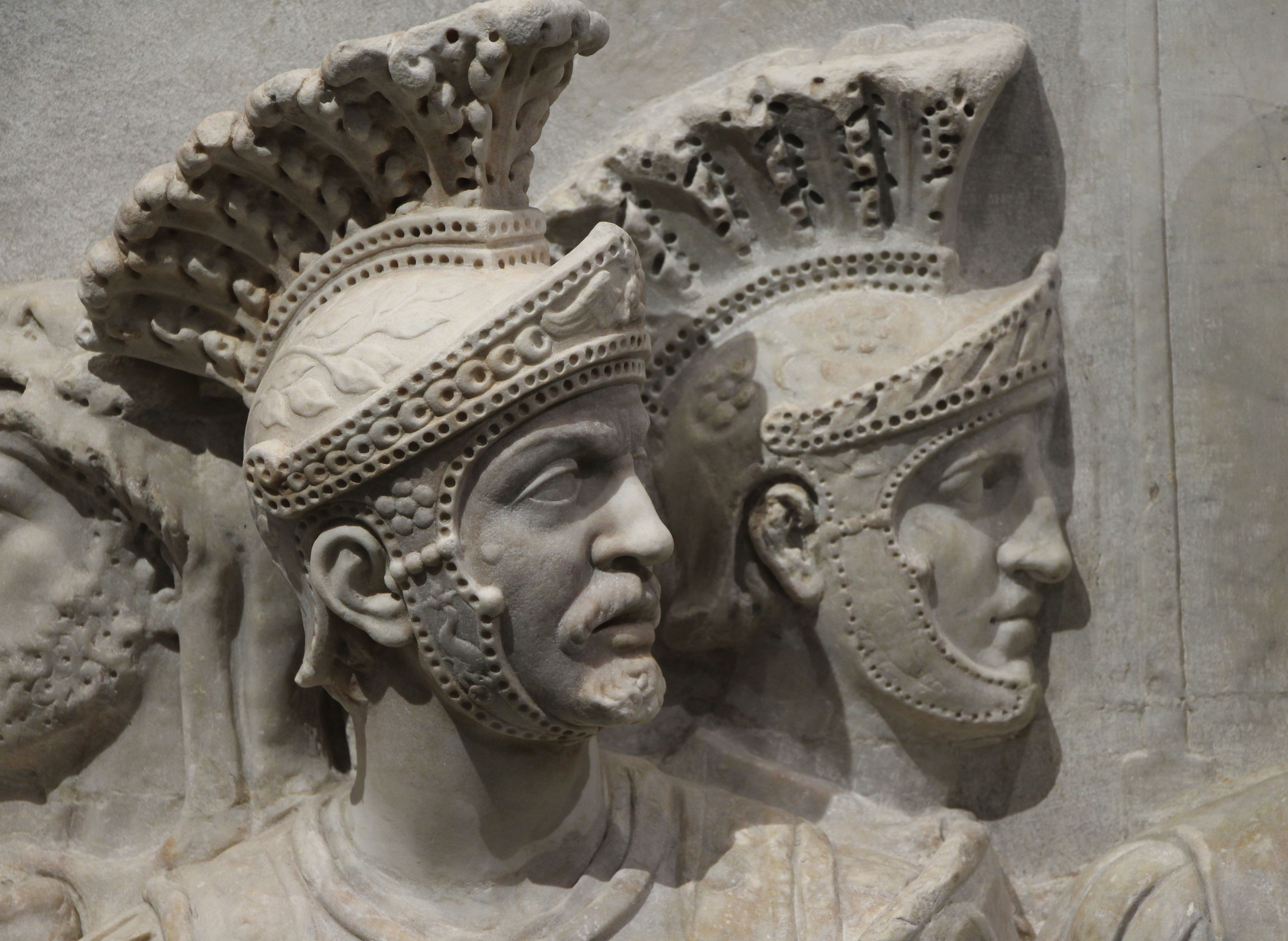

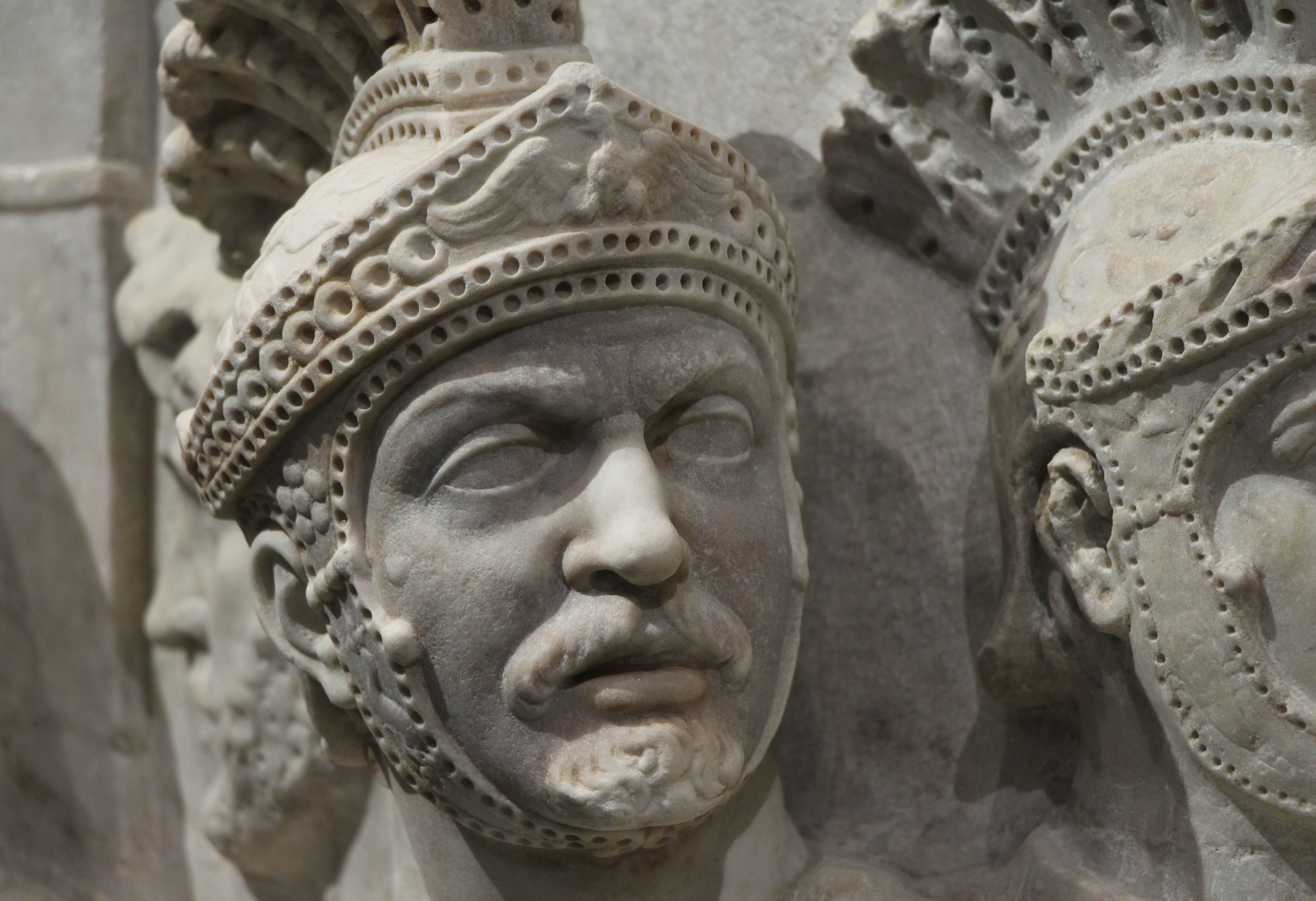

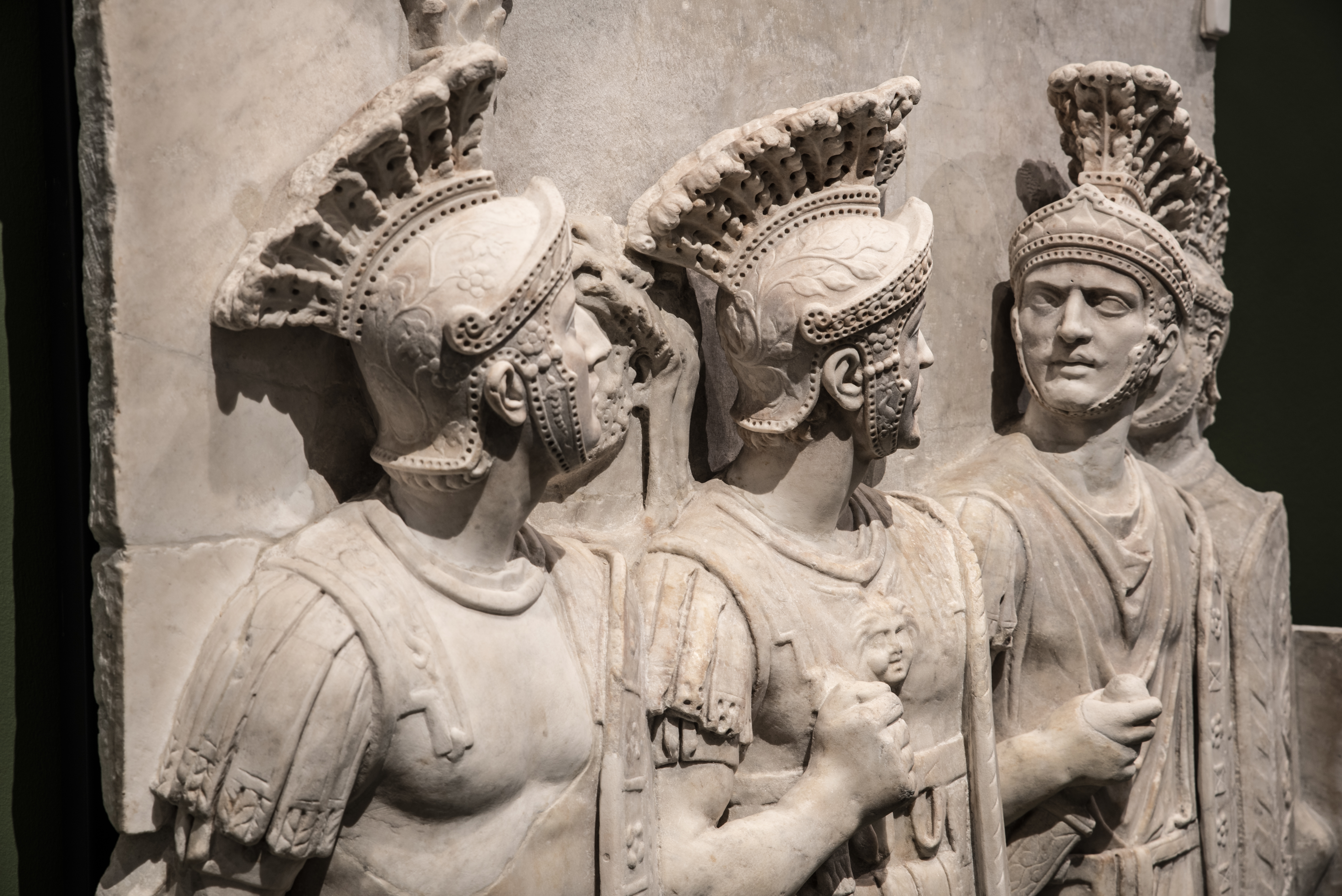

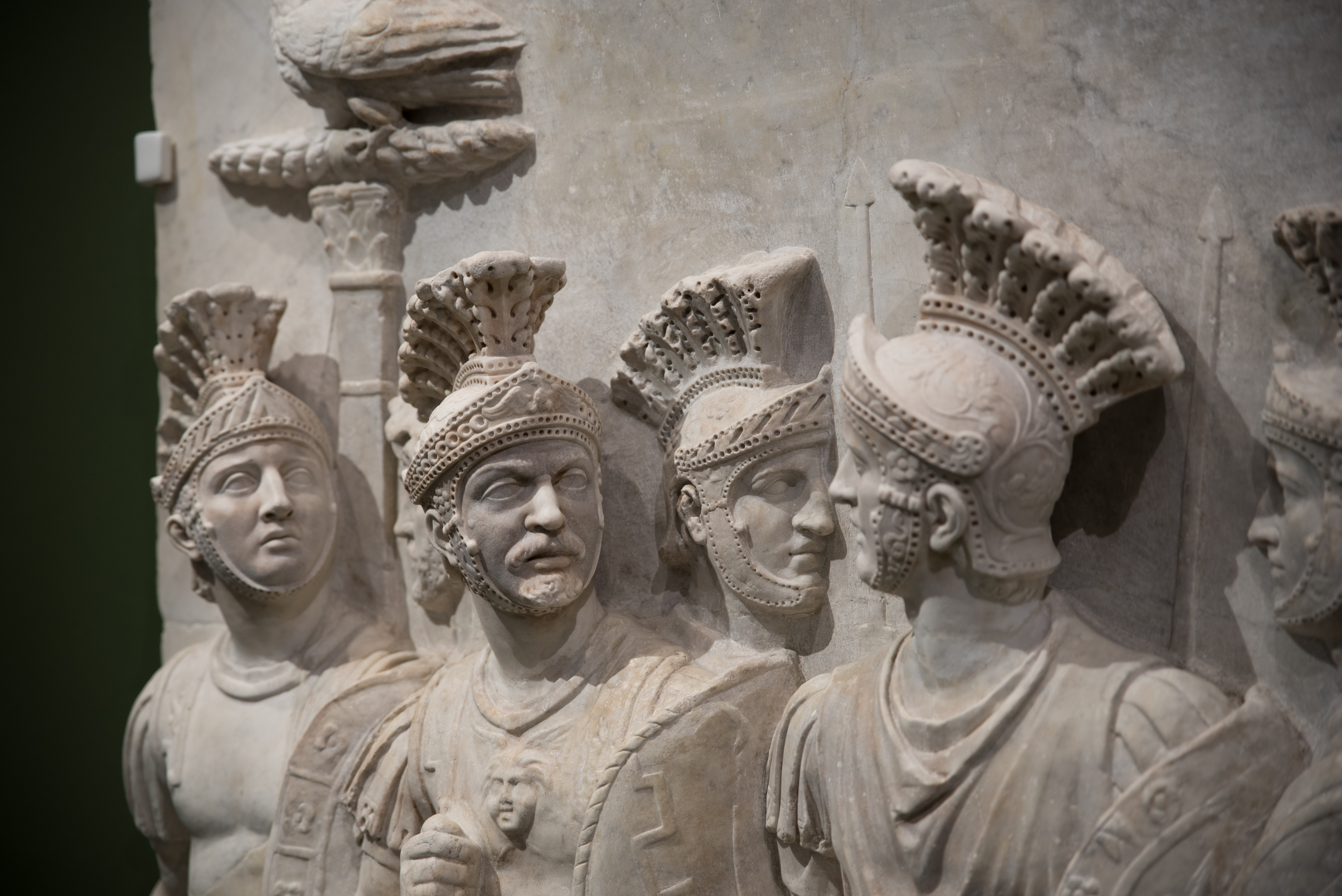

== Provenance ==
The Praetorians Relief was once part of the Arch of Claudius, erected in AD 51 to commemorate the conquest of Britain. The relief is mentioned as early as the 16th century. The head of the standard-bearer is depicted in Album by Jacques d'Angoulême of Reims, on the page dated to 1577. The relief was once in the possession of the Mattei family, in 1824 it was purchased by the French.
