= Arch of Gratian, Valentinian and Theodosius =

Coordinates: 41.9017°N 12.4665°E

The Arch of Gratian, Valentinian and Theodosius (Latin: Arcus Gratiani, Valentiniani et Theodosii) was a triumphal arch built between 379 and 383 AD in Rome. It was situated at the south end of the Pons Aelius, near to the site later occupied by the church of San Celso. It formed as a monumental entrance arch to the bridge.

It was built by Gratian, Valentinian II and Theodosius I from their own money. It was mentioned in the Einsiedeln Itinerary, the Mirabilia and the Ordo Benedicti. It was destroyed before the 14th century and the papacy of Pope Urban V, an era when it was described as destroyed. Some remains were still visible until the 16th century.

== See also ==
- List of Roman triumphal arches
- List of ancient monuments in Rome

== Bibliography ==
- Samuel Ball Platner and Thomas Ashby, A topographical dictionary of Ancient Rome, Oxford University Press, 1929
- Lawrence Richardson, A New Topographical Dictionary of Ancient Rome, Johns Hopkins University Press, 1992
