= Arch of Arcadius, Honorius and Theodosius =

Ancient Roman triumphal arch in Rome

The Arch of Arcadius, Honorius and Theodosius (Latin: Arcus Arcadii Honorii et Theodosii) was an ancient triumphal arch in Rome.

The marble arch was erected by the Roman senate in 405 AD, three years after Stilicho's victory in the Battle of Pollentia. The recorded inscription celebrates the victory as an imperial triumph over the Goths and names the reigning emperors: Arcadius, Honorius, and Theodosius II.

While there are no surviving remains of the structure, it is generally believed to have been located near the Pons Neronianus. One of the three arches is said to have stood under the campanile of Santi Celso e Giuliano in the Middle Ages, but had collapsed by the time of Pope Urban V's papacy.

== See also ==
- List of Roman triumphal arches
- List of ancient monuments in Rome
