= Clivus Capitolinus =

Street in Rome, Italy

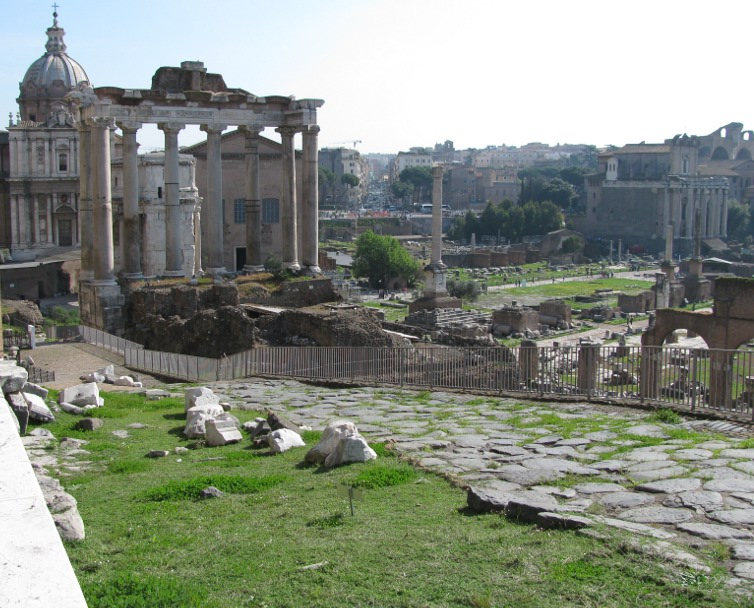
- Clivus Capitolinus starting around Temple of Saturn
- Interactive map of Clivus Capitolinus
- 41°53′N 12°29′E
- Type: Roman road

The main road to the Roman Capitol, the Clivus Capitolinus ("Capitoline Rise") starts at the head of the Roman Forum beside the Arch of Tiberius as a continuation of the Via Sacra; proceeding around the Temple of Saturn and turning to the south in front of the Portico Dii Consentes, it then climbs up the slope of the Capitoline Hill to the Temple of Jupiter Optimus Maximus at its summit. This was traditionally the last and culminating portion of all Roman triumphs.

== Triumph ==
The street is significant as one of the oldest roads in Rome as well as its central location around temples and judicial offices leading to the largest and most important of the Republican temples. Julius Caesar is said to have climbed this road on his knees to offset a bad omen during his triumph.

== History ==
The earliest history of the road as well as the hill itself is not completely clear as much of Rome's earliest records were destroyed in a sacking of the city. The road may have been part of the original route to the Sabine settlement altered when the Temple of Saturn was built. The hills of Rome have an extensive amount of construction built on top of ancient Etruscan stones that can be seen at the rear of the remaining chambers of the Portico Dii Consentes.

Preceded by Campo de' Fiori	Landmarks of Rome; Clivus Capitolinus	Succeeded by Piazza Colonna
