= Vicus Jugarius =

Street in Rome, Italy

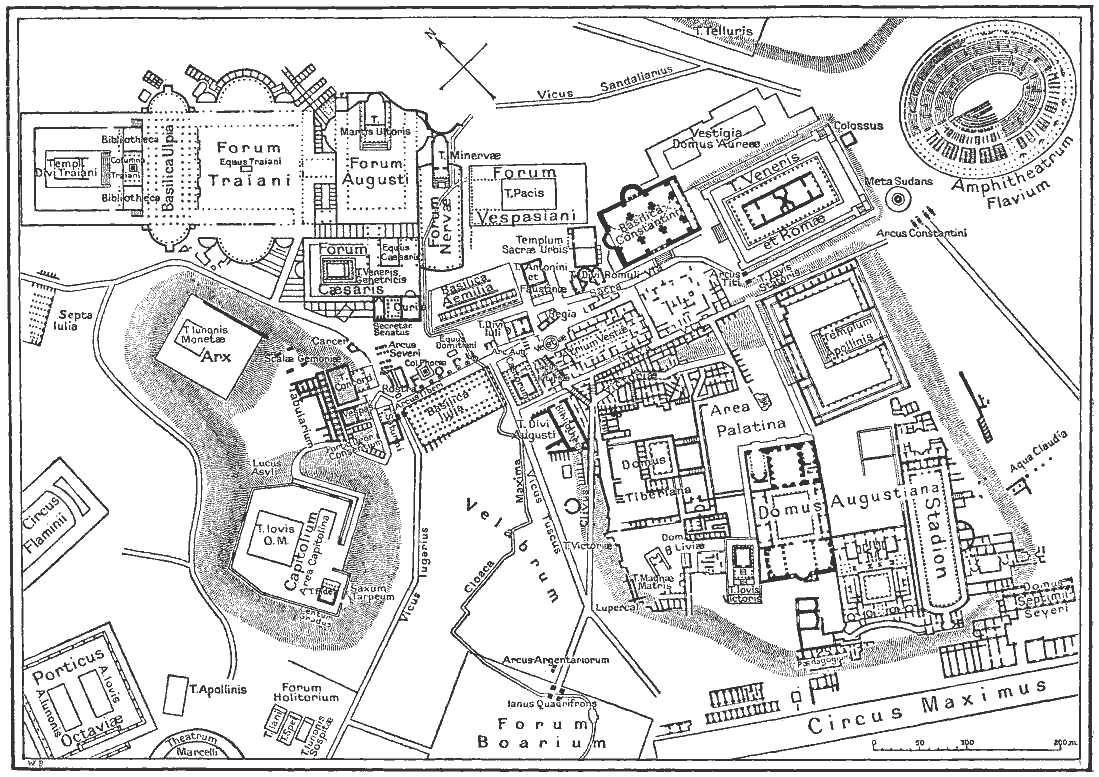
Map of central Rome during the Empire including the Vicus Jugarius in the lower left

The Vicus Jugarius (Latin: Vicus Iugarius), or the Street of the Yoke-Makers, was an ancient street leading into the Roman Forum. The Vicus Jugarius was very old—perhaps even older than Rome itself. The Latin word jugarius can mean either "yoke" or "ridge".

The Vicus Jugarius entered the Forum from the southwest, along the shoulder of the Capitoline Hill and between the Temple of Saturn and the Basilica Julia near Servilius’ Pool. The Arch of Tiberius (now vanished) was built for the street to pass through here. Its other end, in the southern Campus Martius, was near the Forum Holitorium. This was the extent of the street in late Republican and Imperial times, but in former days, it was much longer, extending as far as the Quirinal Hill and representing a part of the original trade route to the Tiber River. Its ancient name may actually have originally signified a “high-road’, rather than the later sense of “yoke”; something like "the Road along the [Capitoline] Ridge".

A spot on the road known as the Equimaelium perhaps recorded the leveling of the home of Spurius Maelius.

== Etymology ==
Latin words associated with jugarius include jugalis ("yoked together") and jugo ("to marry" or "join"). Some words deriving from this Latin root are (in English): "yoke", "join", "juncture", "conjugal" and even "yoga" (from the Sanskrit root yuj, meaning "to yoke" or "to unite"). Juga, or Jugalis, is an epithet of the goddess Juno in her aspect as marriage goddess (she was believed to join a couple in matrimony). As Juno Juga—Juno of the Yoke of Holy Matrimony—she had an altar on the Vicus Jugarius (exact location unknown). Although it was believed by the ancients that this gave its name to the street, in reality, it was probably the other way around.

== See also ==
- Church of Santa Maria della Consolazione
