= Arch of Titus (Circus Maximus) =

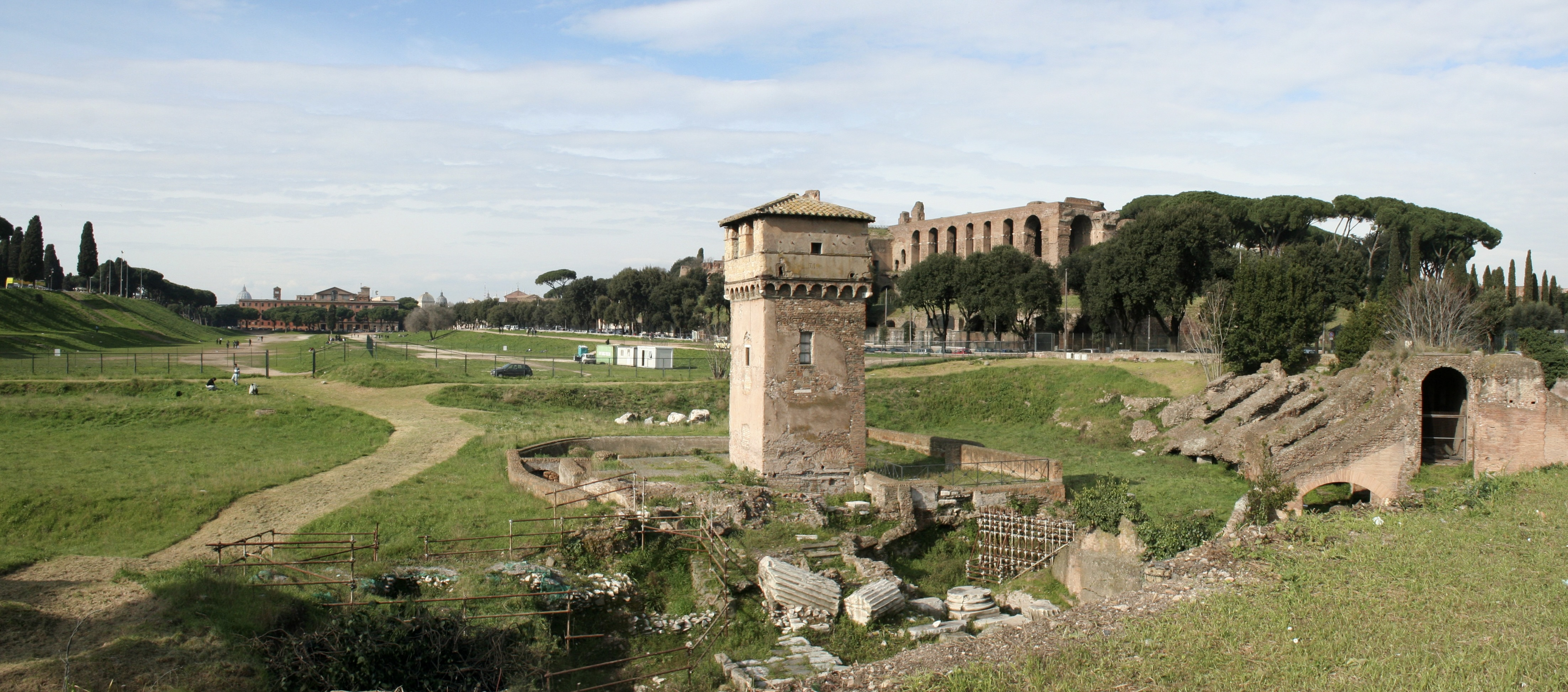
- Circus Maximus - panoramic view

- Location within Rome
- Click on the map for a fullscreen view
- 41°53′4″N 12°29′18″E
- Location: Rome

The lesser-known Arch of Titus was a triple-bay arch erected at the eastern end of the Circus Maximus by the Senate in A.D. 81, in honour of Titus and his capture of Jerusalem in the First Jewish–Roman War. Few traces remain. The inscription (CIL 19151=ILS 264), quoted by an 8th-century Swiss monk known only as the "Einsiedeln Anonymous", makes it clear that this was Titus' triumphal arch. Sculptural fragments of a military frieze have been attributed to the arch.

Architectural and epigraphic fragments of the now lost arch were rediscovered during excavations in 2015.

== See also ==
- List of Roman triumphal arches
- List of ancient monuments in Rome
