= Arch of Claudius (British victory) =

Commemorative Roman arch honouring Claudius's invasion of Britain

Coordinates: 41°53′58″N 12°28′52″E

The Arch of Claudius was a triumphal arch in Rome built in honour of the emperor Claudius's successful invasion of Britain in AD 43. It was dedicated in AD 51 but had already been anticipated in commemorative coins minted in AD 46–47 and 49, which depicted it summounted by an equestrian statue between two trophies. However, the real structure was a conversion of one of the arches of the Aqua Virgo aqueduct at the point where it crossed the Via Flaminia, the main road to the north, just north of the Saepta.

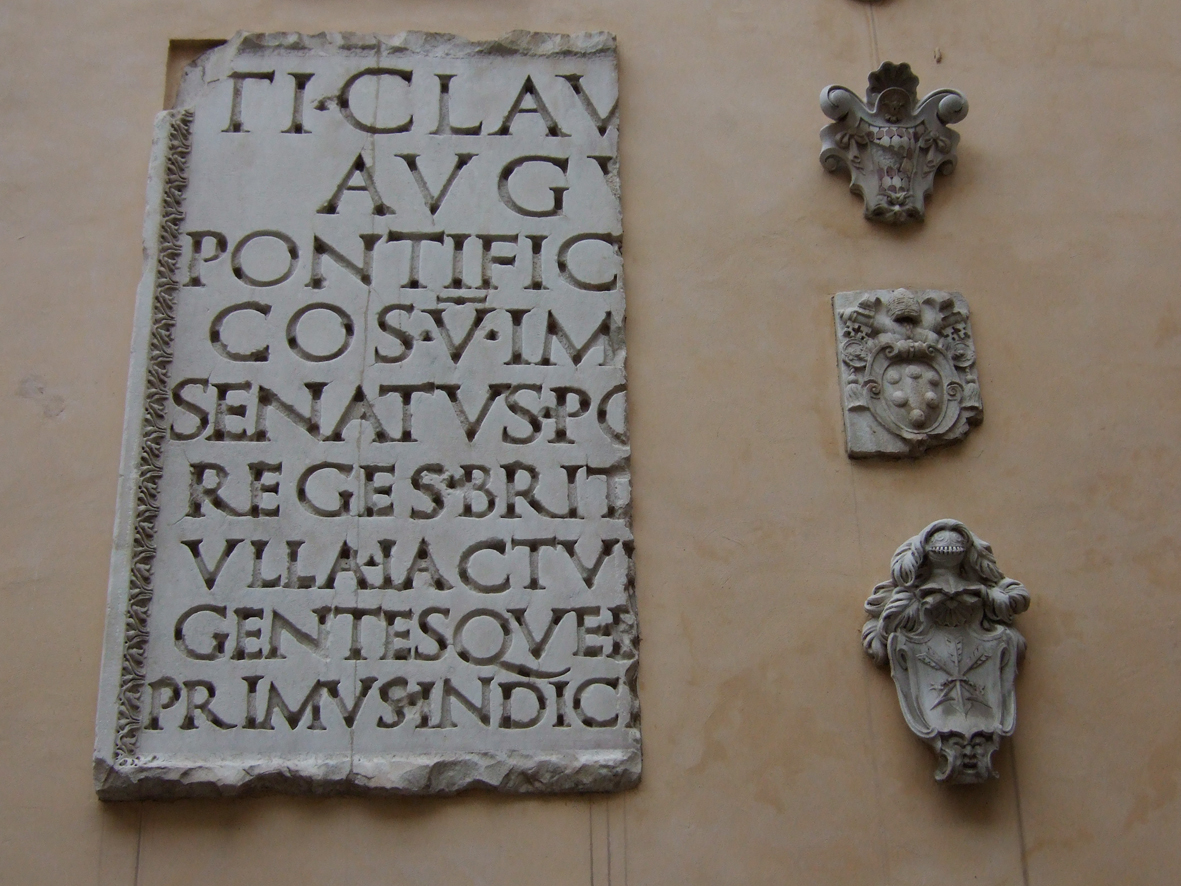
Inscription from the Arch of Claudius, Capitoline Museums

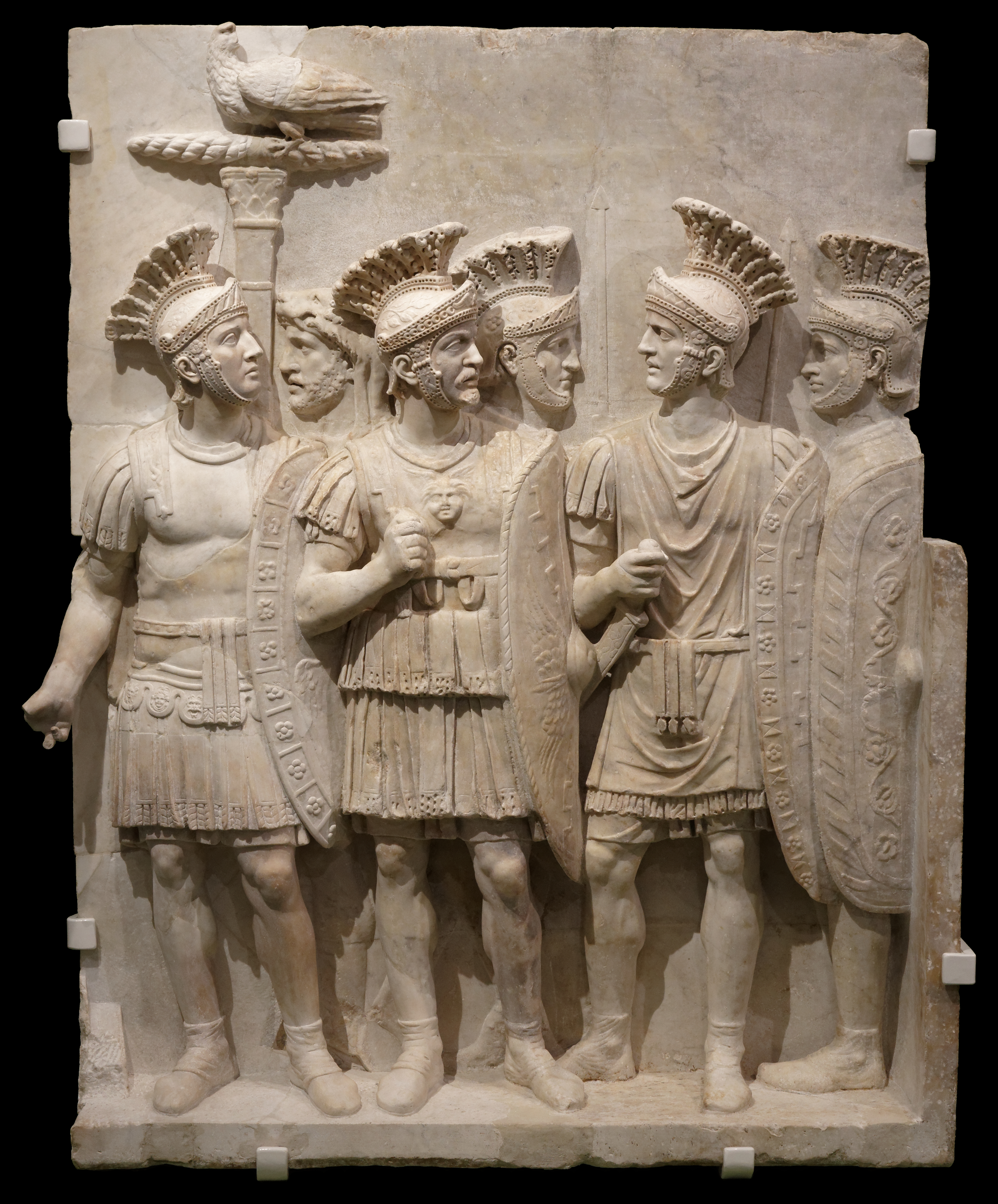
The Praetorians Relief from the Arch of Claudius

== Inscription ==
The portions of surviving inscription survive in the Capitoline Museums and can be reconstructed with the aid of identical inscriptions on commemorative arches at Boulogne-sur-Mer and Cyzicus. It reads:

The Roman Senate and People to Tiberius Claudius Caesar Augustus Germanicus, son of Drusus, Pontifex Maximus, Tribunician power eleven times, Consul five times, Imperator 22 times, Censor, Father of the Fatherland, because he received the surrender of eleven kings of the Britons defeated without any loss, and first brought barbarian peoples across the Ocean into the dominion of the Roman people.

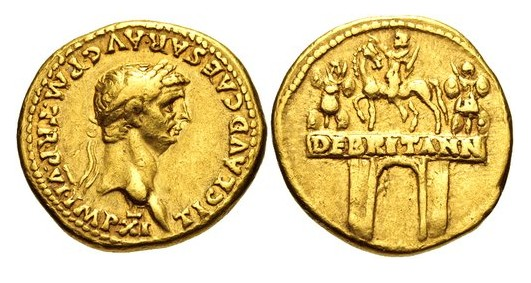
An aureus of Claudius, depicting the arch

== Destruction and Remains ==
The condition of the arch appears to have deteriorated as early as the eighth century and is no longer extant. However, portions of the structure were discovered in 1562, 1641 and 1869 and include part of the principal inscription, inscriptions dedicated to other members of the imperial family, some of the foundations, and fragments of sculpture.

== Primary sources ==
Textual sources

- Suet. Claud. 17
- Dio LX.22

Numismatic sources

- The Monuments of Ancient Rome as Coin Types (1989) by Philip V. Hill
- Freeman & Sear Catalog No.12 (2005), item 536.
- BM Claud. 29, 32‑35, 49‑50
- Cohen, Claudius 16‑24
- HJ 468‑9; LS III.125‑6
- PBSR III.220‑223

Epigraph sources

- Corpus Inscriptionum Latinarum (CIL) VI.920‑923 = 31203‑4

Archaeological sources

- For reliefs discovered in the 1920s which may belong to it, see Notizie degli Scavi 1925, 230‑233; Bocconi, Musei Capitolini, 292.9; 294.14; YW 1925‑6, 112.

== See also ==
- List of Roman triumphal arches
- List of ancient monuments in Rome
