= Arch of Alexander Severus =

Triumphal arch in Dougga, Tunisia

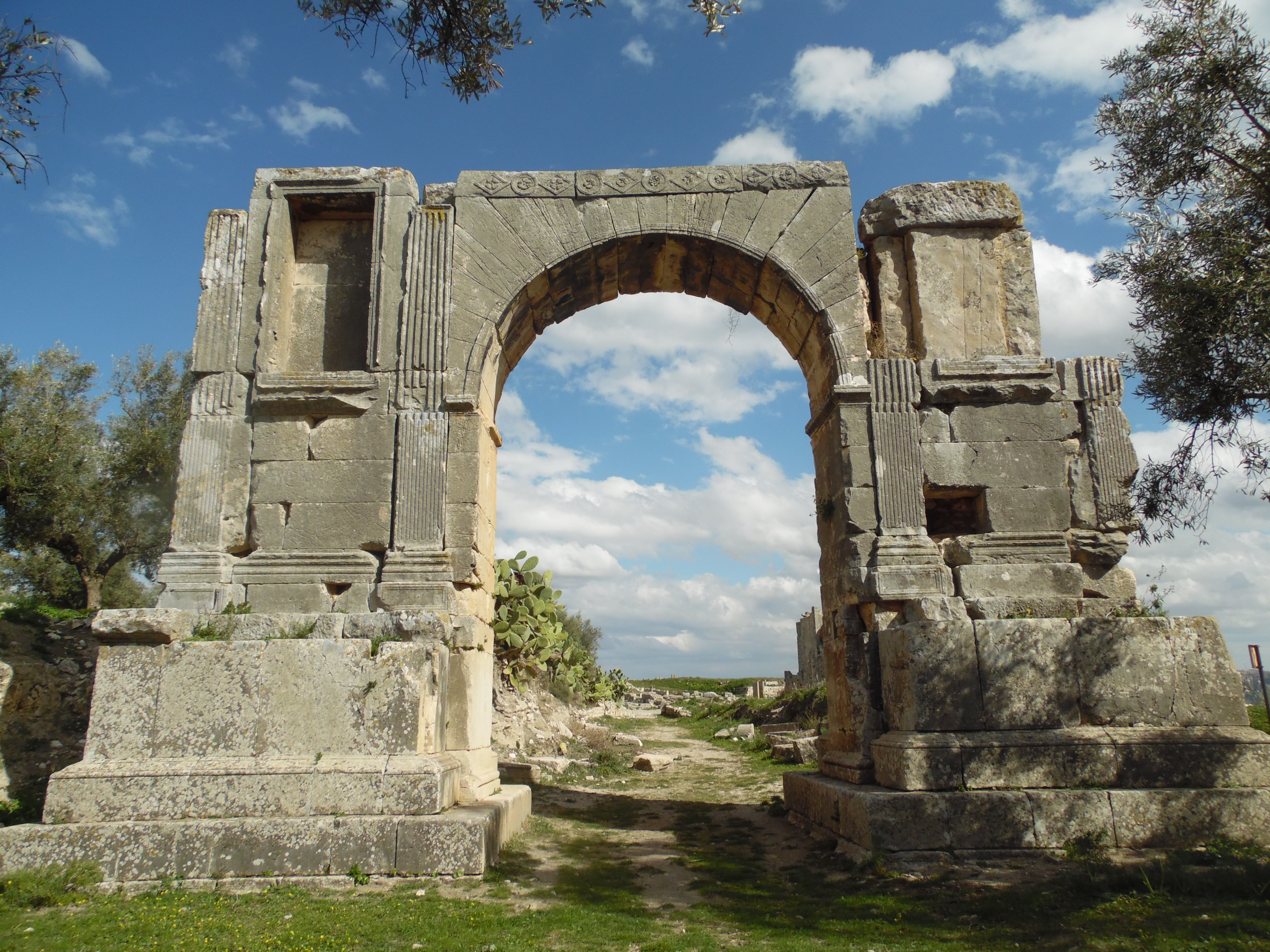
- 36.4233°N 9.2168°E
- Location: Dougga, Béja, Tunisia
- Type: Roman arch
- Dedicated to: Emperor Alexander Severus

The Arch of Alexander Severus is a Roman triumphal arch in the ancient civitas of Thugga, located in Dougga, Béja, Tunisia. It was dedicated to the Roman Emperor Alexander Severus (r. 222–235).

The arch was built in 228, in gratitude to the emperor for his beneficence towards the city. It functioned as one of the city gates, at the end of a road linking to the road between Carthage and Tébessa.

The preserved arch is the span of a single vault, about 4 metres wide, and lateral pylons with niches, which would have been framed by detached columns on tall plinths which are now lost (fluted pilasters remain at the rear). Only a single minor trace of the entablature remains, immediately above the blocks of the archway.

The arch together with the other monuments of the archaeological site of Dougga, was included in the list of World Heritage Sites by UNESCO in 1997.

== See also ==
- List of Roman triumphal arches
- Libyco-Punic Mausoleum of Dougga

== Bibliography ==
- M. C. Poinssot, Les ruines de Dougga, Tunis 1958, pp. 61 e 71
- Mustapha Khanoussi, Dougga, Agence de mise en valeur du patrimoine et de promotion culturelle, Tunis 2008, ISBN 978-9973-954-33-6, p. 58
