= Via Traiana =

Roman road

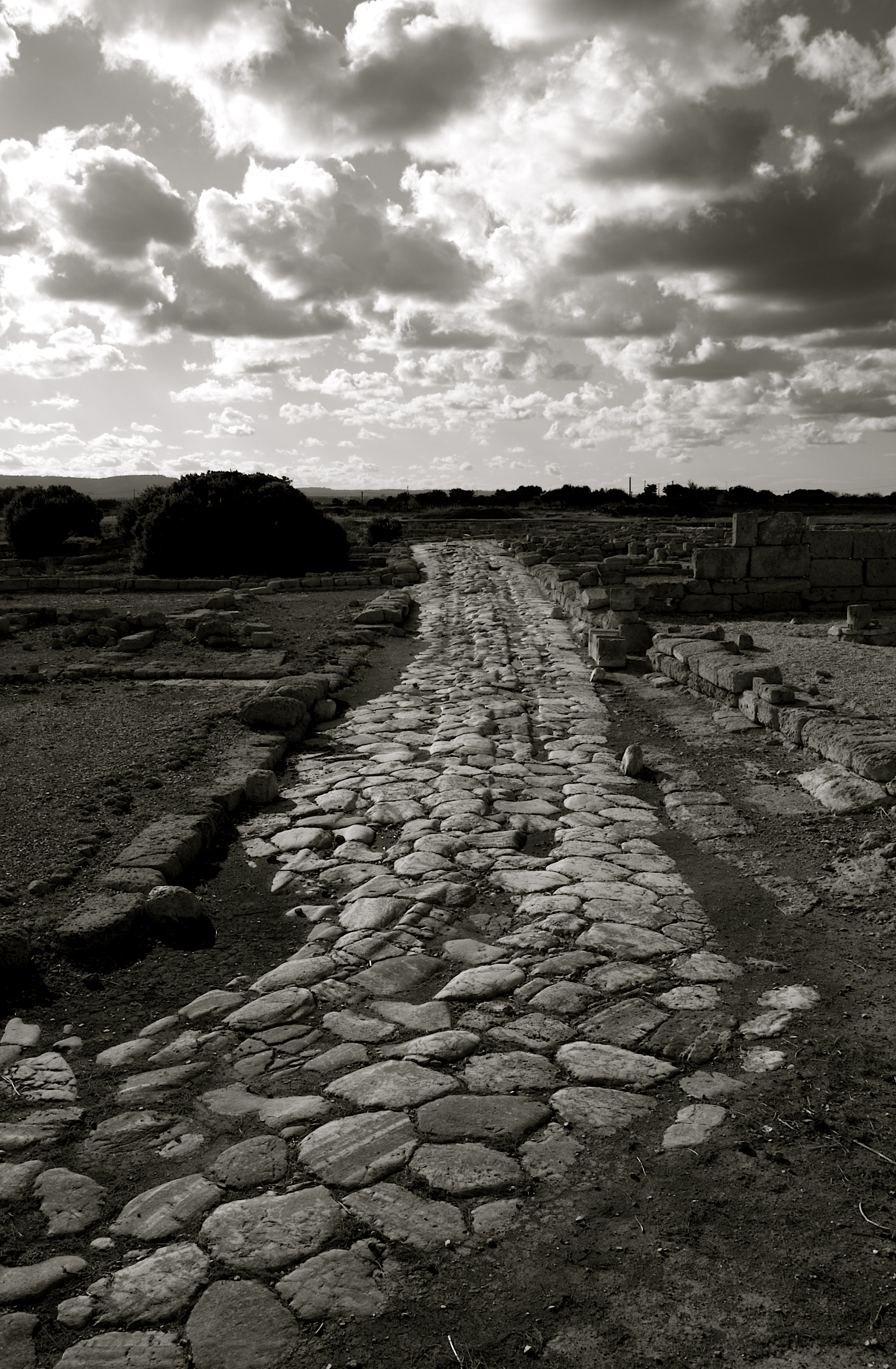
- The road in Egnazia
- Type: Roman road
- Location: Benevento to Brindisi

History
- Built: 109 AD
- Built by: Trajan

UNESCO World Heritage Site
- Part of: Via Appia. Regina Viarum
- Criteria: Cultural: iii, iv, vi
- Reference: 1708-018
- Inscription: 2024 (46th Session)

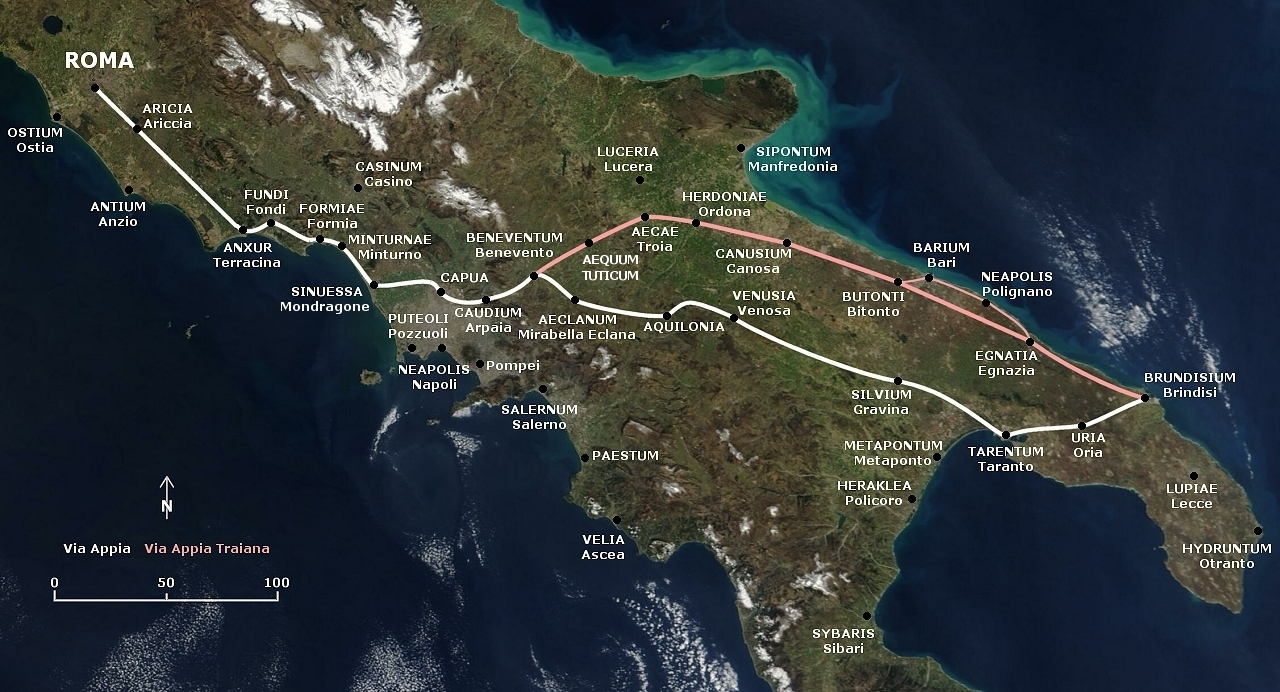
Via Appia (white) and Via Traiana (red)

The Via Traiana was an ancient Roman road. It was built by the emperor Trajan as an extension of the Via Appia from Beneventum, reaching Brundisium (Brindisi) by a shorter route (i.e. via Canusium, Butuntum and Barium rather than via Tarentum). This was commemorated by an arch at Beneventum.

Along with the Via Appia proper, since 2024 the Via [Appia] Traiana entered UNESCO World Heritage List under the comprehensive name of Via Appia Regina Viarum.

== Background ==
Via Traiana was constructed in 109 AD by Emperor Trajan at his own expense. It was built during a period of relative freedom from military campaigns. Thus the Via Appia, from which Via Traiana was constructed as an extension, lost its original importance as a military highroad that connected Venosa (Venusia) and Taranto (Tarentum). Furthermore, the maintenance of direct military communications between Venusia, the military colony of 291 BC, and Rome, was no longer needed except in times of civil war, and the Via Appia simply became a means of reaching Brindisi.

== Route ==
Strabo indicates correctly that traveling to Beneventum from Brundisium via the route of the later Via Traiana was a good day shorter than the old Republican road, Via Appia. Although the actual measurement shows Via Appia to be 203 miles (327 km) and Via Traiana 205 miles (330 km) from Brundisium to Beneventum, the difference lies in their topography. There are a number of severe hills and difficult terrain along Via Appia until it reaches Venusia which is about 66 miles (106 km) away from Beneventum. In contrast, although Via Traiana does encounter equally demanding passages as well in the first 40 miles (64 km) from Beneventum, there is not another serious hill all the way to Brundisium.

== Roman bridges ==
There are the remains of several Roman bridges along the road, including the Ponte dei Ladroni, Ponte delle Chianche, Ponte Pietra, Ponte Rotto (across Carapelle river), Ponte Rotto (across Cervaro river), Ponte sul Ofanto and Ponte Valentino.

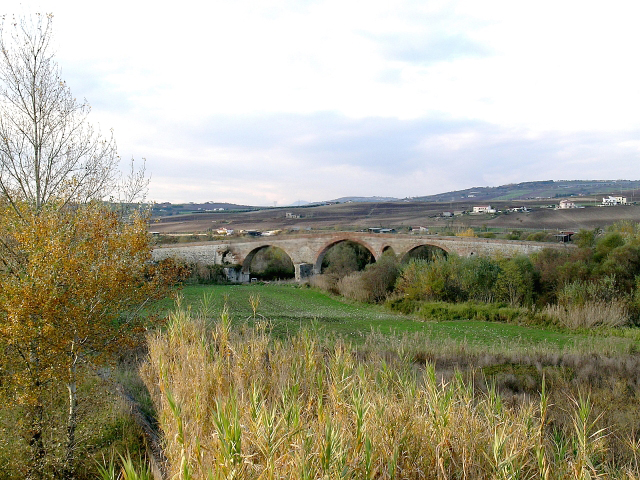
Ponte Valentino

== See also ==
- Roman bridge
- Roman engineering

== Sources ==
- Via Traiana. "The Oxford Classical Dictionary." 3rd ed. 2003.
- Strabo. "Geography: Books 6-7." Trans. Horace Leonard Jones. Cambridge: Harvard University Press, 1995.
- The Via Traiana. "Papers of the British School at Rome," Vol. VIII, No.5; pages 104-171. London: Macmillan & Co., Limited, 1916.
