= Arch of Tiberius =

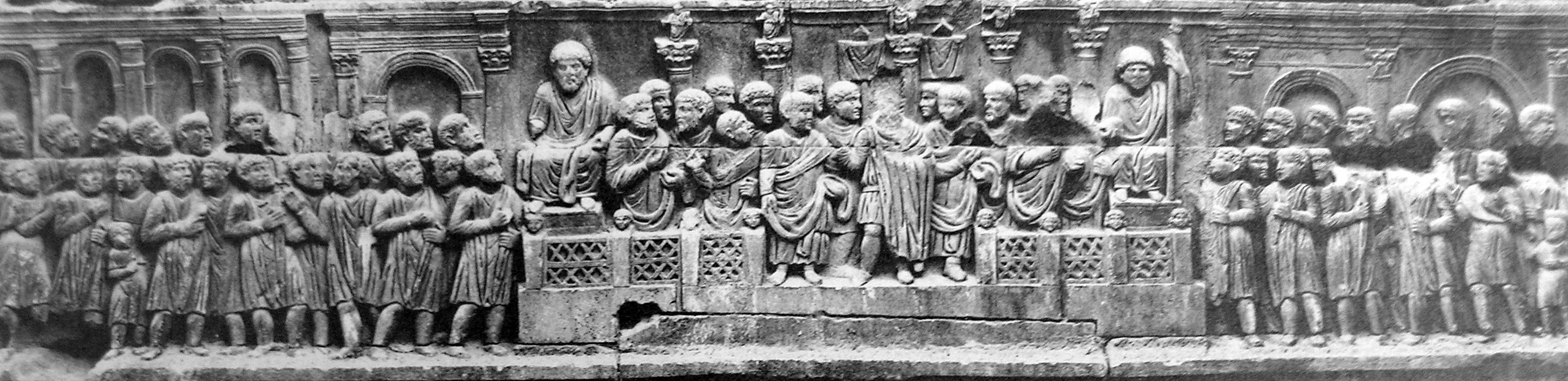
Frieze from the Arch of Constantine showing the Arch of Tiberius immediately to the left of Constantine

The Arch of Tiberius (Italian: Arco di Tiberio; Latin: Arcus Tiberii) was a triumphal arch built in 16 AD in the Forum Romanum to celebrate the recovery of the eagle standards that had been lost to Germanic tribes by Varus in 9 AD. The Roman general Germanicus had recovered the standards in 15 or 16 AD.

The Arch spanned the Vicus Jugarius between the Temple of Saturn and the Basilica Julia. It was dedicated to the emperor Tiberius because in the Imperial period only the emperor could celebrate a Triumph, so the victory of Germanicus was celebrated as a triumph of Tiberius. Very little is known about this monument. It is mentioned only once, by Tacitus, and it is known from a relief on the Arch of Constantine. It appears to have been a single arch, like the later Arch of Titus, flanked by two columns of the Corinthian order. The foundations of the Arch have been found on the Forum, but nothing is visible.

Remains of the arch were uncovered between 1835 and 1848, during construction of the ponte della Consolazione, but the foundation was not discovered until 1900.

== See also ==
- List of Roman triumphal arches
- List of ancient monuments in Rome
