= Arch of Trajan (Benevento) =

Roman arch in Benevento

Coordinates: 41°7′57.08″N 14°46′45.15″E

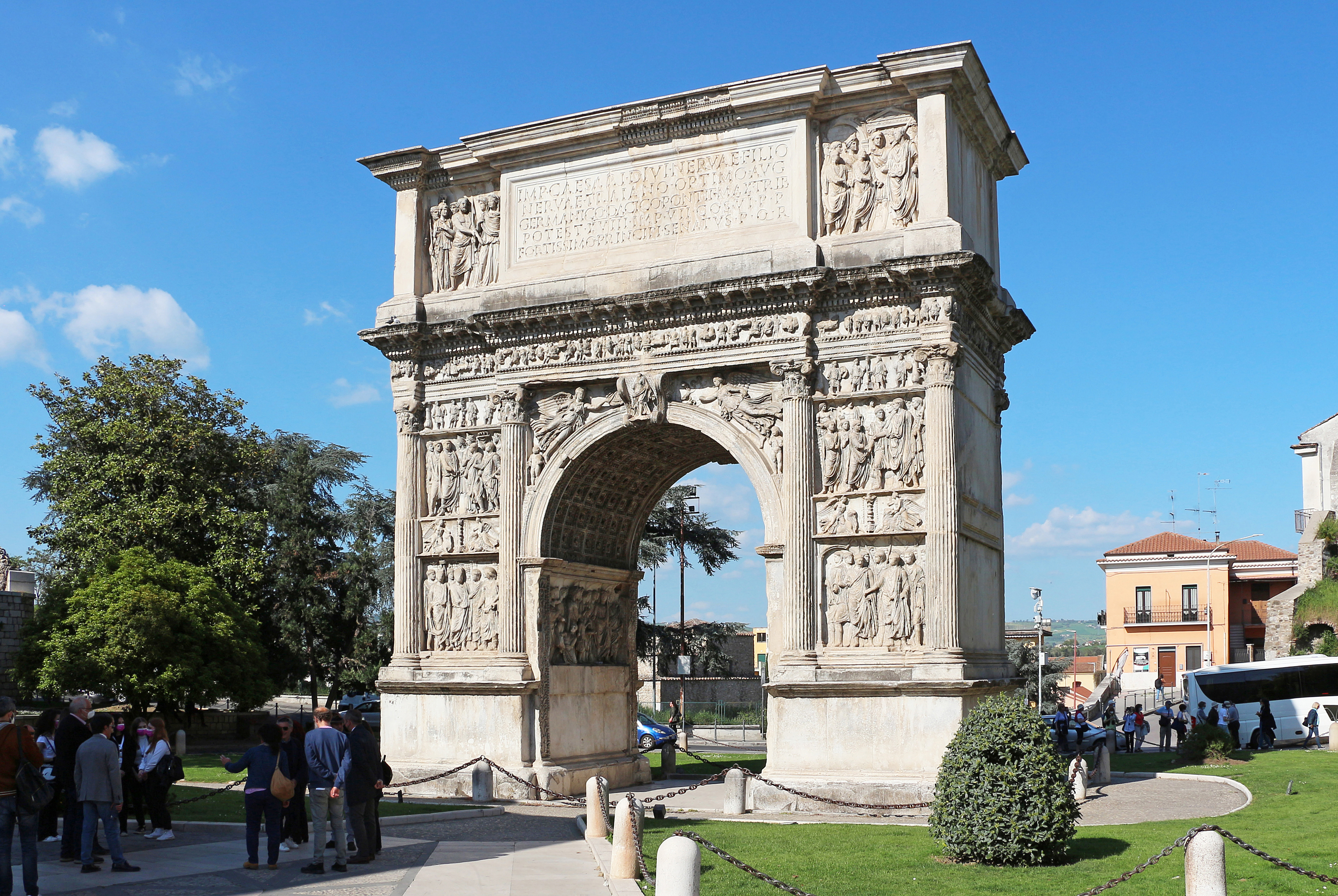
Arch of Trajan, city side.

The Arch of Trajan (Italian: Arco di Traiano) is an ancient Roman triumphal arch in Benevento, southern Italy. It was erected in honour of the Emperor Trajan across the Via Appia, at the point where it enters the city.

== History ==
The arch was built between 114 and 117.

In Lombard times, it was incorporated into the southern sector of the city walls and became known as Porta Aurea ("Golden Gate"). The church of Sant'Ilario, now housing the Videomuseum of the Arch, was built nearby. The arch was studied by Sebastiano Serlio in Renaissance times and drawn by Giovanni Battista Piranesi in the 18th century.

It was restored several times due to aging and earthquakes: under Pope Urban VIII, then in 1661, 1713 (after the marble architrave crumbled) and 1792. In 1850, on the occasion of Pope Pius IX's visit to Benevento, it was isolated through demolition of the adjoining buildings.

== Description ==
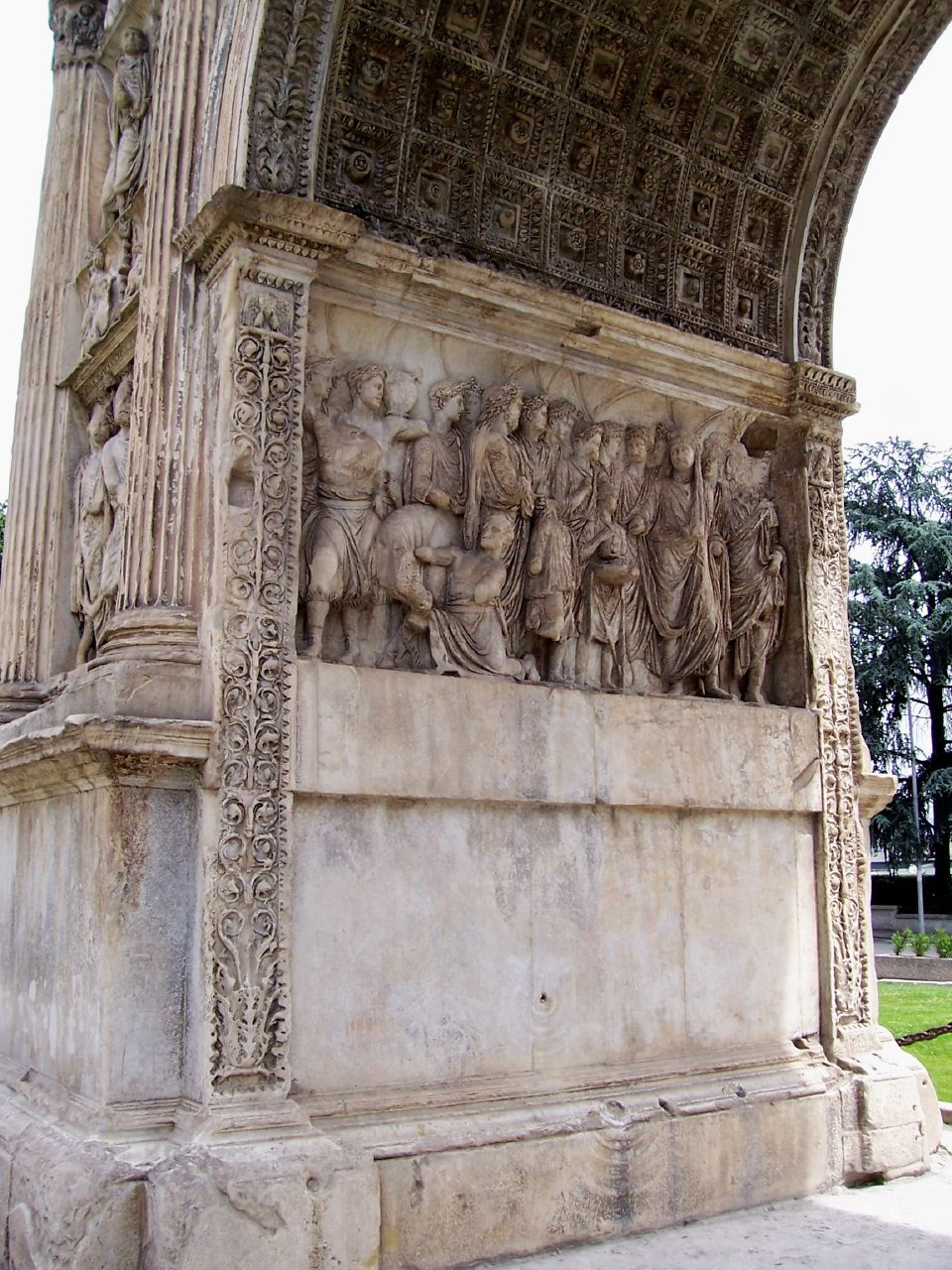
Detail of the sacrifice panel in the archway.

The arch has a single, barrel-vaulted archway, and is 15.60 m high and 8.60 m wide. Each façade has four pilasters at the corners of the two side pillars, supporting an entablature. Above the architraves is an attic which, like them, juts out in its central section above the archway. The arch is built in limestone covered by opus quadratum of Parian marble slabs. It has richly sculpted decorations on the two main façades. The attic features a dedicatory inscription and, at the sides, two bas-relief panels: on the outer sides the left-hand one, only partially preserved, depicted the Homage of the divinities of the province's countryside, and the one on the right the Founding of provincial colonies. On the inner side, on the left, was a depiction of Trajan welcomed by the Capitoline Triad and, on the right, Trajan in the Forum Boarium.

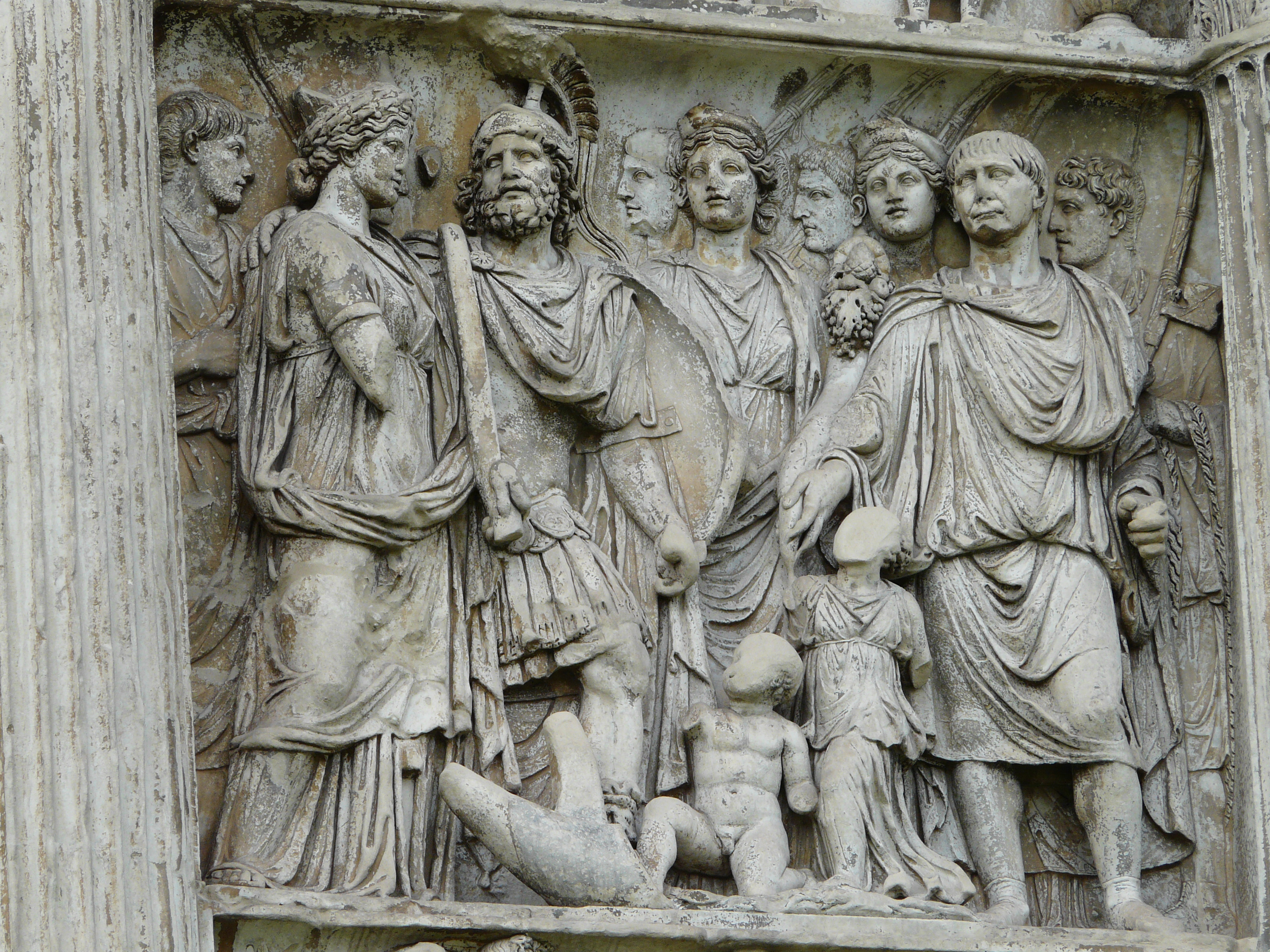
Trajan with barbarian princes

The frieze on the entablature portrays Trajan's triumphal procession after his victory over Dacia. On each of the pylons, between the corner pilasters, are two panels, one above the other, with scenes and allegories of imperial activities (Trajan's formal arrival at Rome, the concession of Roman citizenship to the auxiliaries, Trajan welcomed by the Senate, the Roman People and the Equestrian order, and others). They are separated by narrower decorative panels depicting Victories offering sacrifices of bulls in the center and Amazons at the top.

The pendentives of the archway depict personifications of the Danube and of Mesopotamia on the outer side, and Victory and Military Loyalty on the side facing the city, accompanied by the genii of the Four Seasons. On the arch's keystones are further personifications: Fortune on the outer, and Rome on the city side. The internal façade of the archway has two wide sculpted panels, portraying scenes of Trajan in Benevento: on the left (from inside the city) is the Sacrifice for the opening of the Via Traiana, with the emperor flanked by lictors, while on the right is the institution of the alimenta (a beneficent institution created by Trajan to help children in Roman Italy), symbolized by pieces of bread on the table in the center, with personifications of Italian cities with children. The vault has a coffered ceiling, in the center of which is a personification of the Emperor crowned by Victory.

The dedicatory inscription on the attis reads:

IMP⸱CAESARI⸱DIVI⸱NERVAE⸱FILIO
NERVAE⸱TRAIANO⸱OPTIMO⸱AVG
GERMANICO⸱DACICO⸱PONTIF⸱MAX⸱TRIB
POTEST⸱XVIII⸱IMP⸱VII⸱COS⸱VI⸱P⸱P
FORTISSIMO⸱PRINCIPI⸱SENATVS⸱P⸱Q⸱R

Imperatori Caesari, divi Nervae, filio Nervae Traiano Optimo Avgusto, Germanico, Dacico, pontifici maximo Tribunicia Potestate XVIII, Imperatori VII, Consuli VI, Patri Patriae, fortissimo principi, Senatus Populusque Romanus.

In English:

To Imperator Caesar, son of the divine Nerva, Nerva Trajan Optimus Augustus, conqueror of the Germans and the Dacians, pontifex maximus, vested with tribunician power eighteen times, proclaimed Imperator seven times, consul six times, Pater Patriae, the most valiant prince, the Senate and the people of Rome.

== See also ==
- List of Roman triumphal arches

== Sources ==
- Bianchi Bandinelli, Ranuccio; Mario Torelli (1976). "Etruria-Roma". L'arte dell'antichità classica. Turin: Utet. p. Arte romana 118.
