= Arch of Augustus, Rome =

Triumphal arch in Rome, Italy

Arch of Augustus
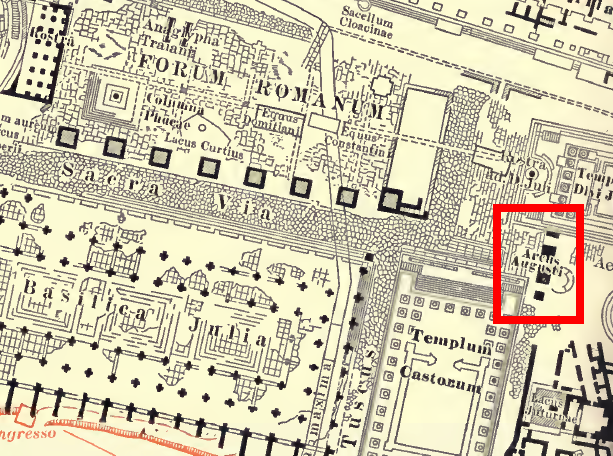
- Proposed location of the Arch of Augustus in the Forum

- Shown in ancient Rome
- Click on the map for a fullscreen view
- 41°53′31″N 12°29′10″E

The Arch of Augustus (Latin: arcus Octaviani, Italian: Arco di Augusto) was the triumphal arch of Augustus, located in the Roman Forum. It spanned the Via Sacra, between the Temple of Castor and Pollux and the Temple of Caesar, near the Temple of Vesta, closing off the eastern end of the Forum. It can be regarded as the first permanent three-bayed arch ever built in Rome.

The archaeological evidence shows the existence of a three-bayed arch measuring 17,75 x 5.25 meters between the Temple of Caesar and the Temple of Castor and Pollux, although only the travertine foundations of the structure remain.

Ancient sources mention arches erected in honor of Augustus in the Forum on two occasions: the victory over Antony and Cleopatra in 31 BC, and the recovery of the standards lost to the Parthians in 20 BC.

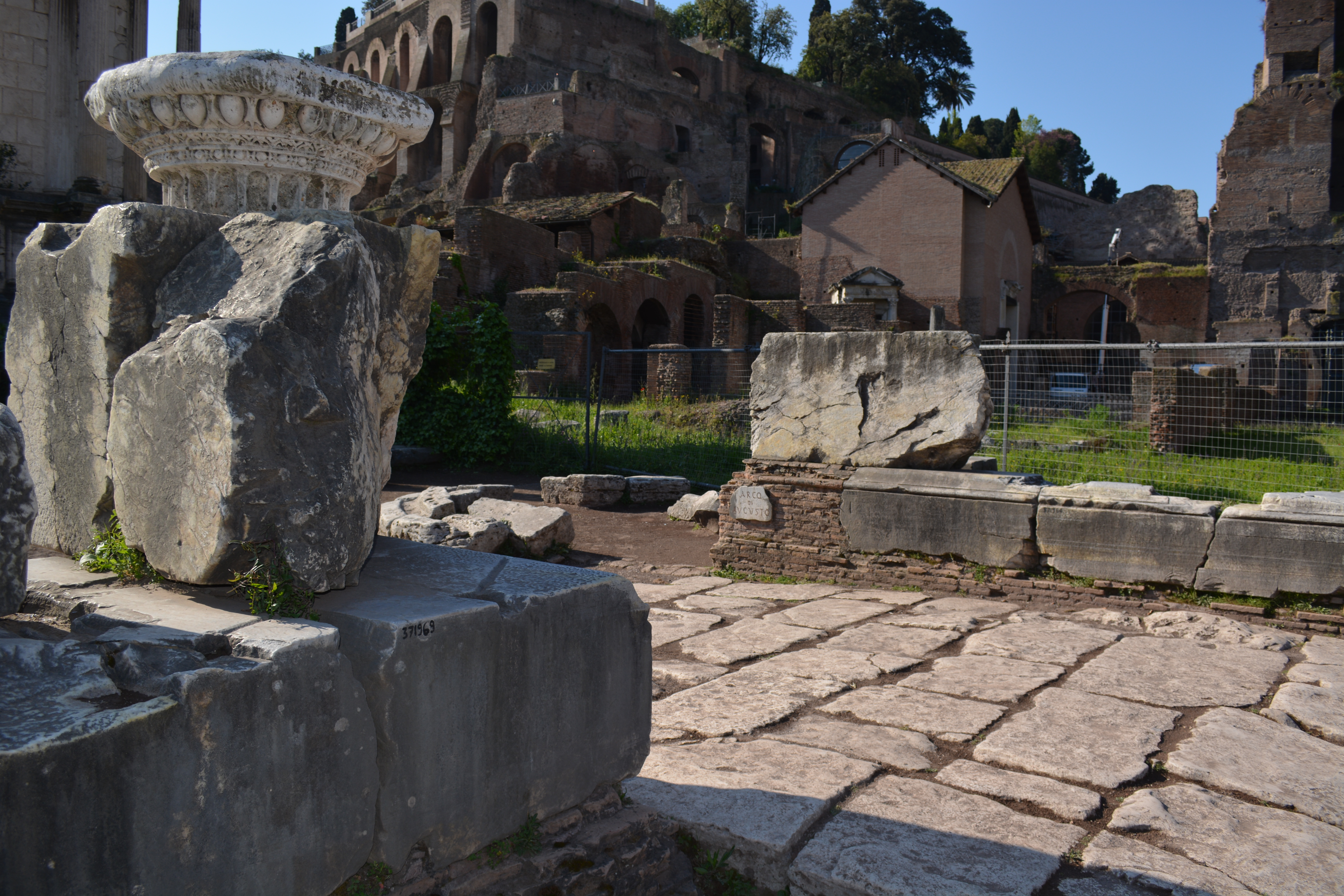
Ruins of the Arch of Augustus in the Roman Forum. Photo taken in 2014.

== Actian Arch ==
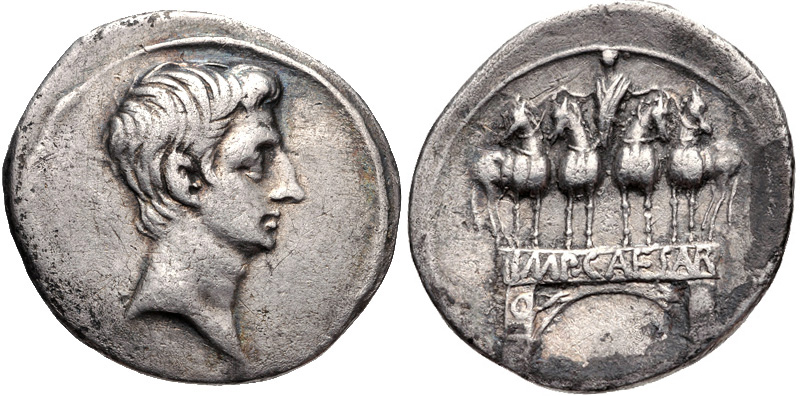
Denarius with one-bayed Augustan arch, probably struck in Rome in ca. 30-29 BC.

Cassius Dio reports that after the Battle of Actium the Senate granted Augustus a triumph and an arch in an unspecified spot in the Forum. No contemporary description of the structure remains, although it is possible that the Actian Arch is represented on a coin minted in ca. 30–29 BC. However, the arch depicted on the coin could also refer to another instance in which Augustus was granted a triumphal arch after the victory over Sextus Pompey in 36 BC.

The 13th century travel guide to Rome De mirabilibus urbis Romae describes it in detail, though there is no other evidence that the arch still existed by the time this was composed. He claims it is "Not far from this temple (the Pantheon)" and bears the following inscription "Because Augustus restored a conquered world to Roman rule, regaining it for the Republic, the Roman people erected this monument". It was supposedly "Multiple", "constructed of marble", and had a "stone platform, which projects outwards quite a distance" where "statues were placed of military commanders and those who had either distinguished themselves on campaign or fallen in the thick of battle", including a statue of Augustus himself. The arch described also had reliefs of the army, war, and the Battle of Actium wherein "Caesar, emerging from the struggle with a greater victory than he expected, pursues Cleopatra's fleeing galley." The arch may also have borne reliefs of Augustus's triumph after this event, but the wording is unclear.

A marble slab 2.65 m long and 0.59 m high bearing an inscription in honor of Augustus as savior and keeper of the Republic discovered in 1546 and subsequently lost was attributed to the Actian Arch.

== Parthian Arch ==
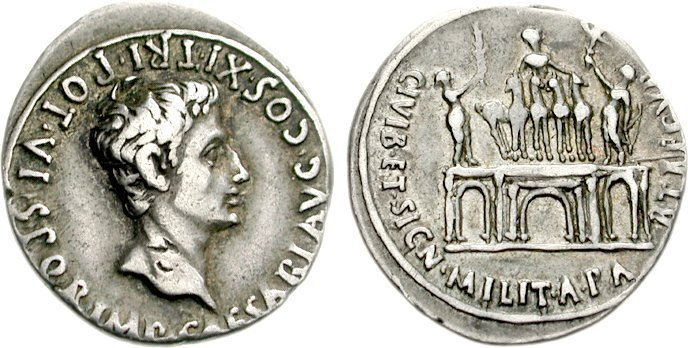
Denarius with three-bayed arch, struck in Tarraco in 18 BC.

Cassius Dio mentions an ovatio and another triumphal arch granted to Augustus after he recovered the eagles lost in the Battle of Carrhae and during Antony's campaign in Atropatene without specifying its location. A Veronese scholiast commenting on Vergil's Aeneid situates the structure next to the Temple of Caesar.

The arch is not mentioned by Augustus in his autobiography; moreover, Suetonius and Cassiodorus report that he refused to celebrate a triumph in 19 BC, leading some scholars to believe that the Parthian Arch might have been projected but never realized.

Coins minted in Pergamon, Tarraco, and Rome in the years 19–16 BC show a three-bayed arch with a quadriga on the top and figures holding bows and standards on the lower bays. Accordingly, the proposed reconstructions display a structure consisting of a higher central vaulted bay with Corinthian semi-columns and a triumphal chariot on top. The lower bays had square-topped pediments with Doric columns or semi-columns surmounted by statues of Parthians holding bows and the recovered eagles.

The Fasti Consulares and the Fasti Triumphales, unearthed in the Forum in 1546, may have been originally part of this monument, standing in the lateral aediculae; alternatively, they may have belonged to the nearby Regia.

== See also ==
- Arch of Augustus (disambiguation) (three other arches)
- List of Roman triumphal arches

== Bibliography ==
- Brian Rose, C. (2005). The Parthians in Augustan Rome. American Journal of Archaeology, 109, No. 1, pp. 21–75.
- von Freytag gen. Löringhoff, B., and Prayon, F. (1982). Praestant Interna. Festschrift Ulrich Hausmann.
- Hammond, N.G.L. and Scullard, H.H. (eds.) (1970). Oxford Classical Dictionary, Clarendon Press.
- Holland, L. B. (1946). The Triple Arch of Augustus. American Journal of Archaeology, 50, No. 1, pp. 52–59.
- Horaceck, S. (2015). “Arco Partico,” digitales forum romanum, http://www.digitales-forum-romanum.de/gebaeude/partherbogen/?lang=en.
- Nedergaard, E. (1994). La collocazione originaria dei Fasti Capitolini e gli archi di Augusto nel Foro Romano. Bullettino della Commissione archeologica comunale di Roma, 96, pp. 33–77.
- Reale Accademia dei Lincei. Classe di scienze morali, storiche e filologiche (1883). Memorie della Classe di scienze morali, storiche e filologiche.
- Richter, O. (1889). Die Augustusbauten auf dem Forum Romanum. Jahrbuch des Deutschen Archäologischen Instituts 4, pp. 137–162.
- Sandys, J.E. (1919). Latin Epigraphy: an Introduction to the Study of Latin Inscriptions, Cambridge University Press.
- Simpson, C.J. (1992). On the Unreality of the Parthian Arch. Latomus, 51, Fasc. 4, pp. 835–842.
