= Mirabilia Urbis Romae =

Collection of texts describing Rome

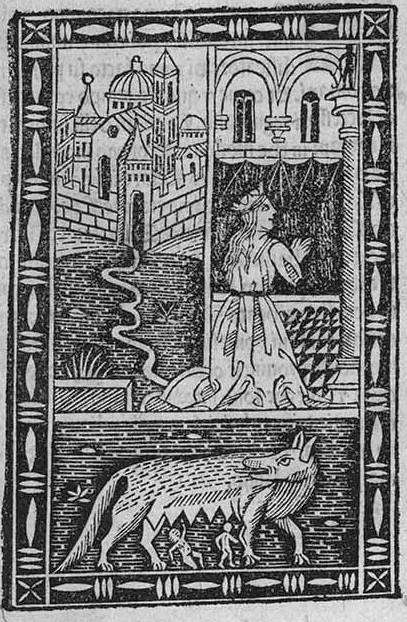
Illustration page from a 1499 book of Mirabilia urbis Romae

Mirabilia Urbis Romae (“Marvels of the City of Rome”) is a grouping of hundreds of manuscripts, incunabula, and books in Latin and modern European languages that describe notable built works and historic monuments in the city of Rome. Most of these texts were intended as guidebooks to the city for pilgrims and visitors. Before the fourteenth century, however, the core text seems instead to have served as a census of the built patrimony of the city, the decus Urbis. This inheritance represented the strength of Rome and the power of the institutions that controlled it.

The first compilation in the Mirabilia tradition, produced in the early 1140s, is credited to a canon of St. Peter’s Basilica named Benedict.

== Original context and content ==
Benedict’s Mirabilia (though it did not yet have that title) constitutes a part of his Liber Polypticus, which also contains papal inventories and another, much earlier census of Roman built works, the Curiosum urbis Romae, which the Mirabilia resembles. The Mirabilia begins with a description of the walls of Rome, detailing towers, fortifications, and gates; then triumphal arches, hills, baths, ancient buildings, theaters, places related to saints’ martyrdom; then bridges, cemeteries, and a few important ancient monuments and histories. There follows an itinerary from the Vatican to the Trastevere, although it focuses almost exclusively on ancient monuments — that is, it describes the ancient heritage of the city, not all points of interest.

This textual nucleus correlates with the late antique concepts of decus (decorum) and ornatus (ornament), used to describe the infrastructure and monuments of Rome that were protected from scavenging and seen to represent the political power of Rome’s rulers. While Benedict’s compilation is closely linked to the papacy, long the steward of Rome’s monuments and infrastructure, other versions from only a little later seem to come instead from the ambit of the Roman Senate, the key institution of the medieval commune then taking control of much of the city. None of the early versions have any clear connection with pilgrimage or travel.

== Combinations and transformations ==
Starting in the 14th century, a re-elaboration of the Mirabilia dubbed the Historia et descriptio urbis Romae began to appear in combination with the Indulgentiae ecclesiarum urbis Romae focusing on the churches of Rome, and the Stationes ecclesiarum urbis Romae that included a calendar listing masses at various Roman churches. These assemblages were clearly intended for pilgrims.

The first important printed copy was compiled around 1475 under the title Mirabilia Romae velpotius Historia et descriptio urbis Romae. For the jubilee year of 1500, Roman printers stayed busy churning out editions in Latin, Italian, German, French, and Spanish. While earlier editions had included fanciful accounts of ancient history and misidentifications of the subjects of portrait statuary, the knowledge accumulated by Renaissance humanists allowed for an increasingly grounded and realistic rendering of Rome’s past. Although guides now included both ancient and Christian monuments, they stopped short of describing recent works of art and architecture.

Some authors set out to supersede the Mirabilia with new descriptions from a fresh point of view. Among them were Leon Battista Alberti with his Descriptio urbis Romae, written ca. 1433. Another was Flavio Biondo with Roma instaurata, written in 1444 and circulated in manuscript; it was printed in 1481.

Modern critical attention was first drawn to the different versions of Mirabilia Urbis Romae by the 19th-century archaeologist of Christian Rome, Giovanni Battista de Rossi.

== Contents ==
The contents of the Mirabilia fall into the following sections, the title headings being taken from the "Liber Censuum":

- De muro urbis (concerning the wall of the city);
- De portis urbis (the gates of the city);
- De miliaribus (the milestones);
- Nomina portarum (the names of the gates);
- Quot porte sunt Transtiberim (how many gates are beyond the Tiber);
- De arcubus (the arches);
- De montibus (the hills);
- De termis (the baths);
- De palatiis (the palaces);
- De theatris (the theatres);
- De locis qui inveniuntur in sanctorum passionibus (the places mentioned in the "passions" of the saints);
- De pontibus (the bridges);
- De cimiteriis (the cemeteries);
- De iussione Octaviani imperatoris et responsione Sibille (the Emperor Octavian's question and the Sibyl's response);
- Quare facti sunt caballi marmorei (why the marble horses were made);
- De nominibus iudicum et eorum instructionibus (the names of the judges and their instructions);
- De columna Antonii et Trajani (the column of Antony and Trajan);
- Quare factus sit equus qui dicitur Constantinus (why the horse was made, which is called of Constantine);
- Quare factum sit Pantheon et postmodum oratio B. (why the Pantheon was built and later oration B.);
- Quare Octavianus vocatus sit Augustus et quare dicatur ecclesia Sancti Petri ad vincula (Why Octavianus was called Augustus, and why the church of St. Peter ad Vincula was so called);
- De vaticano et Agulio (of the Vatican and the Needle);
- Quot sunt templa trans Tiberim (how many temples are beyond the Tiber);
- Predicatio sanctorum (the preaching of the saints).

== See also ==
- List of literary descriptions of cities (before 1550)
