= Temple of Saturn =

Ancient religious monument in Rome, Italy

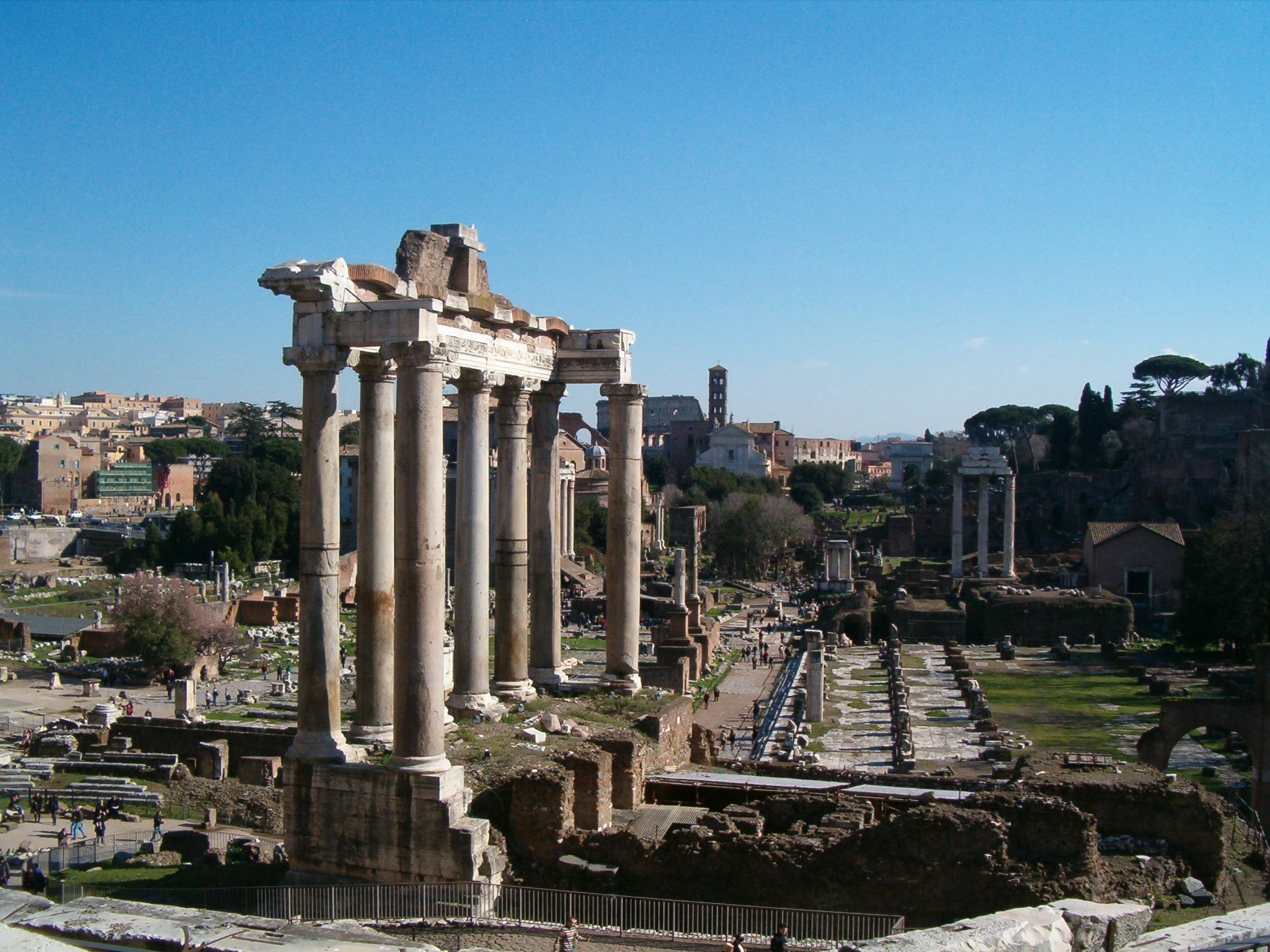
- The temple of Saturn in the Forum Romanum

- Shown within Augustan Rome
- Interactive map of Temple of Saturn
- 41°53′33″N 12°29′03″E
- Type: Roman temple
- Location: Regio VIII Forum Romanum

History
- Built: 497 BC
- Built by: Tarquinius Superbus

The Temple of Saturn (Latin: Templum Saturni or Aedes Saturni; Italian: Tempio di Saturno) was an ancient Roman temple to the god Saturn, in what is now Rome, Italy. Its ruins stand at the foot of the Capitoline Hill at the western end of the Roman Forum. The original dedication of the temple is traditionally dated to 497 BC, but ancient writers disagreed greatly about the history of this site.

== History ==
Construction of the temple is thought to have begun in the later years of the Roman Kingdom under Tarquinius Superbus. Its inauguration by the consul Titus Larcius took place in the early years of the Republic, making it the oldest Republican temple after the Temple of Jupiter Optimus Maximus. The altar of Saturn, which stood in front of the temple, is thought to have been much older and was associated with Saturn's founding of the city on Capitoline Hill. The temple was completely reconstructed by Munatius Plancus in 42 BC.

The present ruins represent the third phase of the Temple of Saturn, which was built after a fire in 360 AD. The extant inscription on the frieze commemorates this restoration undertaken after the fire. This late 4th-century rebuilding reflects pagan revivalism during this time period. The temple would have been closed during the persecution of pagans in the late Roman Empire.

In Roman mythology, Saturn ruled during the Golden Age, and he continued to be associated with wealth. His temple housed the treasury, the aerarium, where the Roman Republic's reserves of gold and silver were stored. The state archives and the insignia and official scale for the weighing of metals were also housed there. Later, the aerarium was moved to another building, and the archives were transferred to the nearby Tabularium. The temple's podium, constructed out of concrete covered with travertine, was used for posting bills.

== Architecture ==
Collapse has left little standing but the remains of the front porch. The partially preserved pediment displays the inscription:

Senatus Populusque Romanus
incendio consumptum restituit

meaning "The Senate and People of Rome restored [the temple] consumed by fire." The pediment and eight surviving columns represent one of the iconic images of Rome's ancient architectural heritage. Except for the Ionic columns capitals carved in the Late Antique style, all of the materials remaining were taken from other buildings. Examples of the spolia used to construct the Temple of Saturn include Egyptian granite column shafts and a late Republican acanthus frieze.

Based on other cult images of Saturn, the statue of the god in the interior was veiled and equipped with a scythe. The image was made of wood and filled with oil. The legs were covered with bands of wool which were removed only on December 17, the day of the Saturnalia. On this feast day, slaves were allowed temporary freedom and family members exchanged gifts.

== See also ==
- Temple of Vesta – Ancient religious monument in Rome, Italy
- List of Ancient Roman temples

Preceded by Temple of Portunus	Landmarks of Rome; Temple of Saturn	Succeeded by Temple of Vesta
