= Kilometre zero =

Location from which distances are traditionally measured

Kilometre zero (or km 0), also known as zero mile marker or zero milepost, is a particular location (usually in the nation's capital city) from which travelled distances are traditionally measured, as in distance markers. Historically, they were markers where drivers could set their odometers to follow the directions in early roaming guidebooks.

One such marker is the Milliarium Aureum ("Golden Milestone") of the Roman Empire, believed to be the origin for the maxim "All roads lead to Rome".

== Countries ==
=== Argentina ===
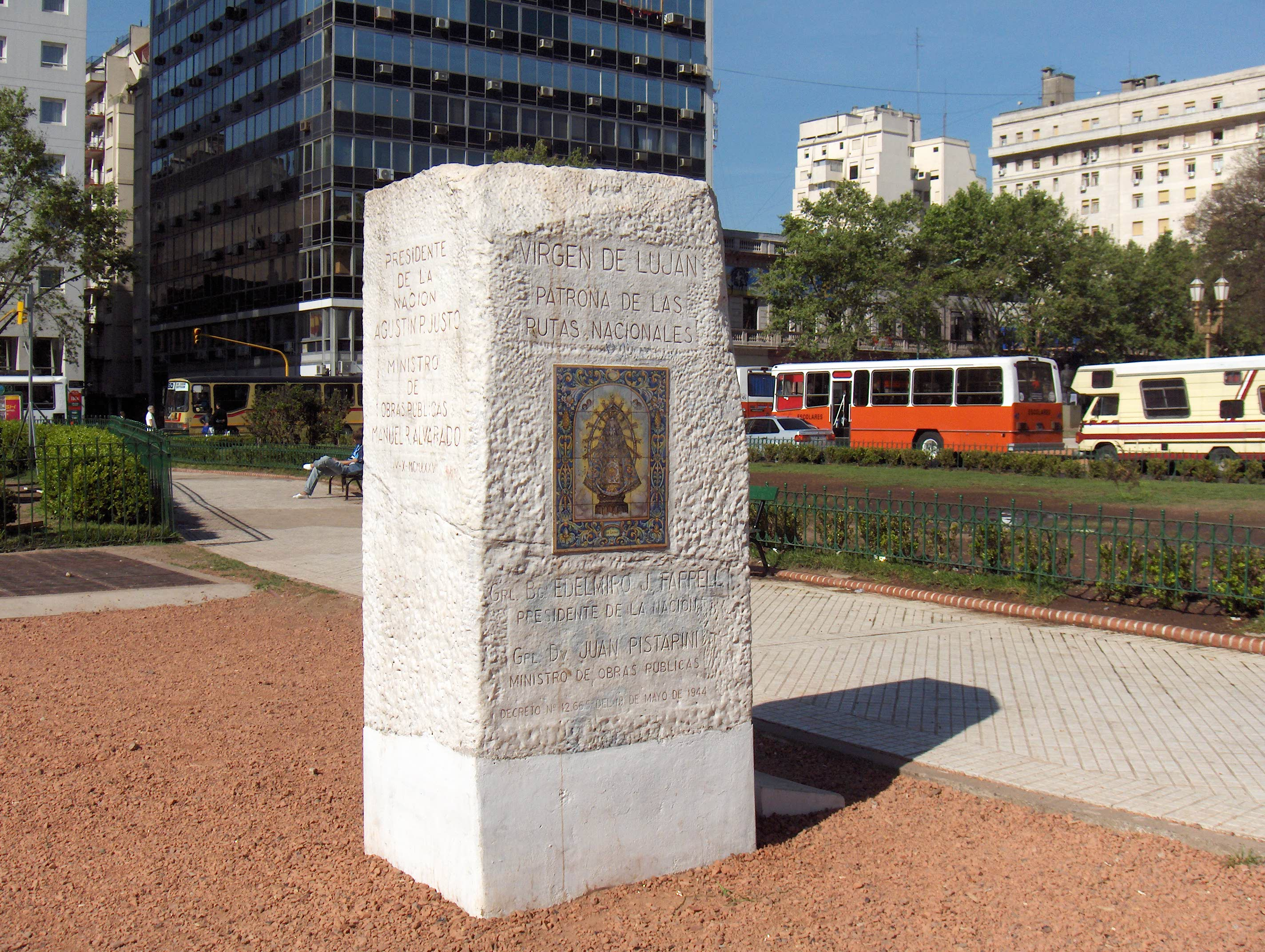
Kilometre zero, Buenos Aires

Argentina marks kilometre zero with a monolith in Plaza Congreso in Buenos Aires. The work of the brothers Máximo and José Fioravanti, the structure was placed on the north side of Plaza Lorea on October 2, 1935; it was moved to its present location on May 18, 1944. An image of Our Lady of Luján (honored on the monolith as "the patron saint of the national road network") appears on the monolith's north face, a relief map of Argentina is on the south face, plaques in honour of José de San Martín are west, and on its eastern side, the date of the decree and the name of the relevant authorities.

=== Australia ===
Highways in Australia are usually built and maintained by the states and territories.

In the state of New South Wales, highway distances (mileages) were traditionally measured from a sandstone obelisk in Macquarie Place in Sydney, designed by Francis Greenway in 1818. The obelisk lists the distances to various locations in New South Wales at the time. For the railway, it is at platform 1 of Central station.

The General Post Office building in Melbourne traditionally serves this purpose in Victoria.

In Western Australia, road distances are measured from Point Zero at 31.9559°S 115.8606°E, which is by the old Treasury Building on the corner of Cathedral Avenue and St Georges Terrace in Perth, because this building once housed the Lands and Surveys Department.

=== Canada ===
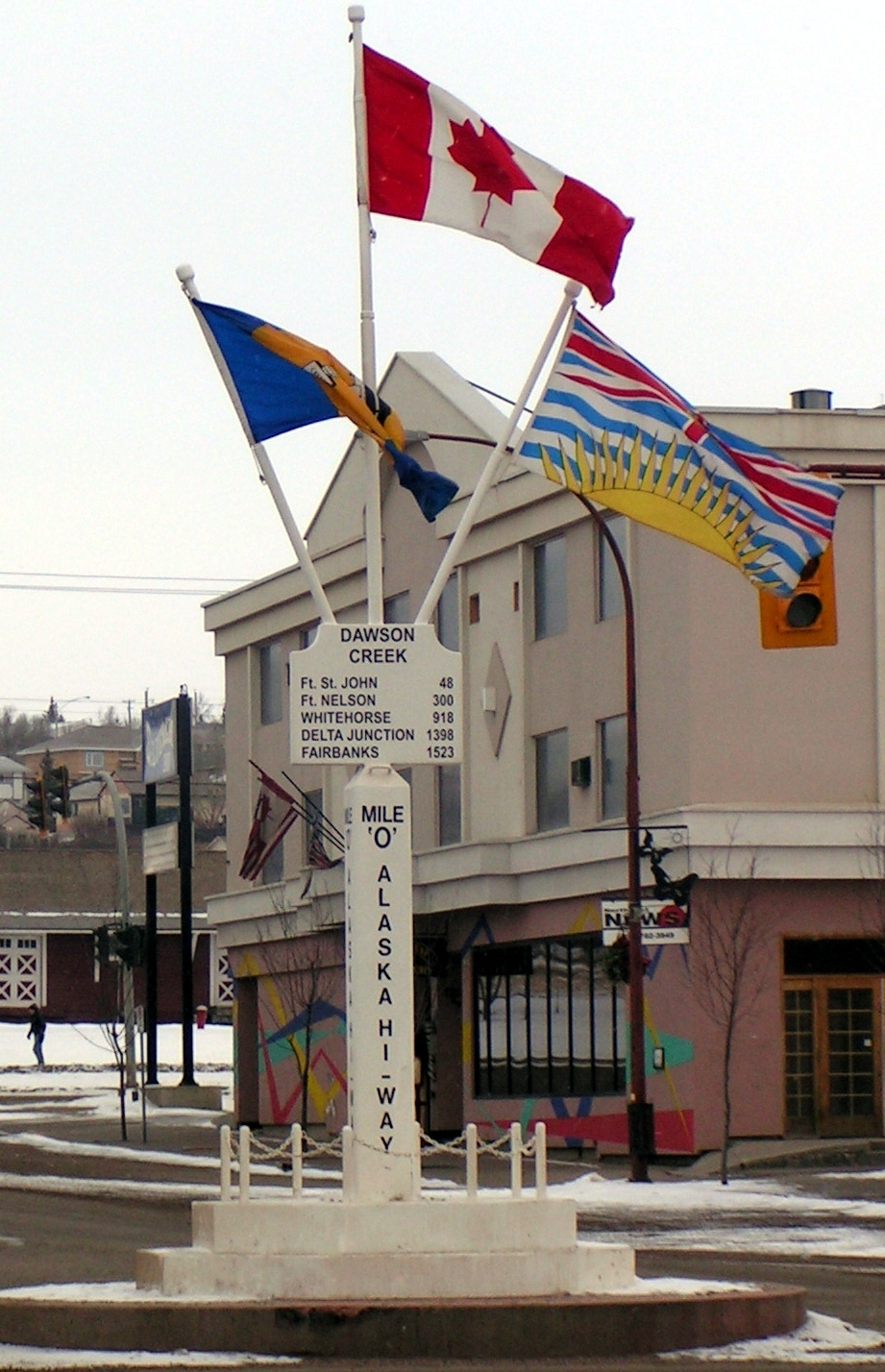
The Mile 0 point for the Alaska Highway in Dawson Creek

- The kilometer zero marker of the eastern origin of the Trans-Canada Highway is in St. John's, Newfoundland.
  - Coordinates: 47°33′40″N 52°42′44″W
  - Altitude: 14.02 m (46 ft)
- The western terminus of the Trans-Canada Highway in Victoria, British Columbia, is on the southern end of Vancouver Island.
- Mile zero of the Trans Canada Trail is adjacent to the Railway Coastal Museum in St. John's, Newfoundland.
  - Coordinates: 47°33′14″N 52°42′50″W
  - Altitude: 4.5 metres (15 ft)
- Mile zero for the Alaska Highway is in Dawson Creek, British Columbia.
- Mile zero of the Old Cariboo Road is in Lillooet, British Columbia. This was the starting point of the Cariboo Gold Rush Trail, on which the communities 93 Mile House, 100 Mile House, and 150 Mile House are located.
  - Coordinates: 50°41′29″N 121°56′15″W
  - Altitude: 250 metres (820 ft)
- Mile zero for the Mackenzie Highway is in Grimshaw, Alberta.
  - Coordinates: 56°11′30″N 117°36′37″W

=== Chile ===
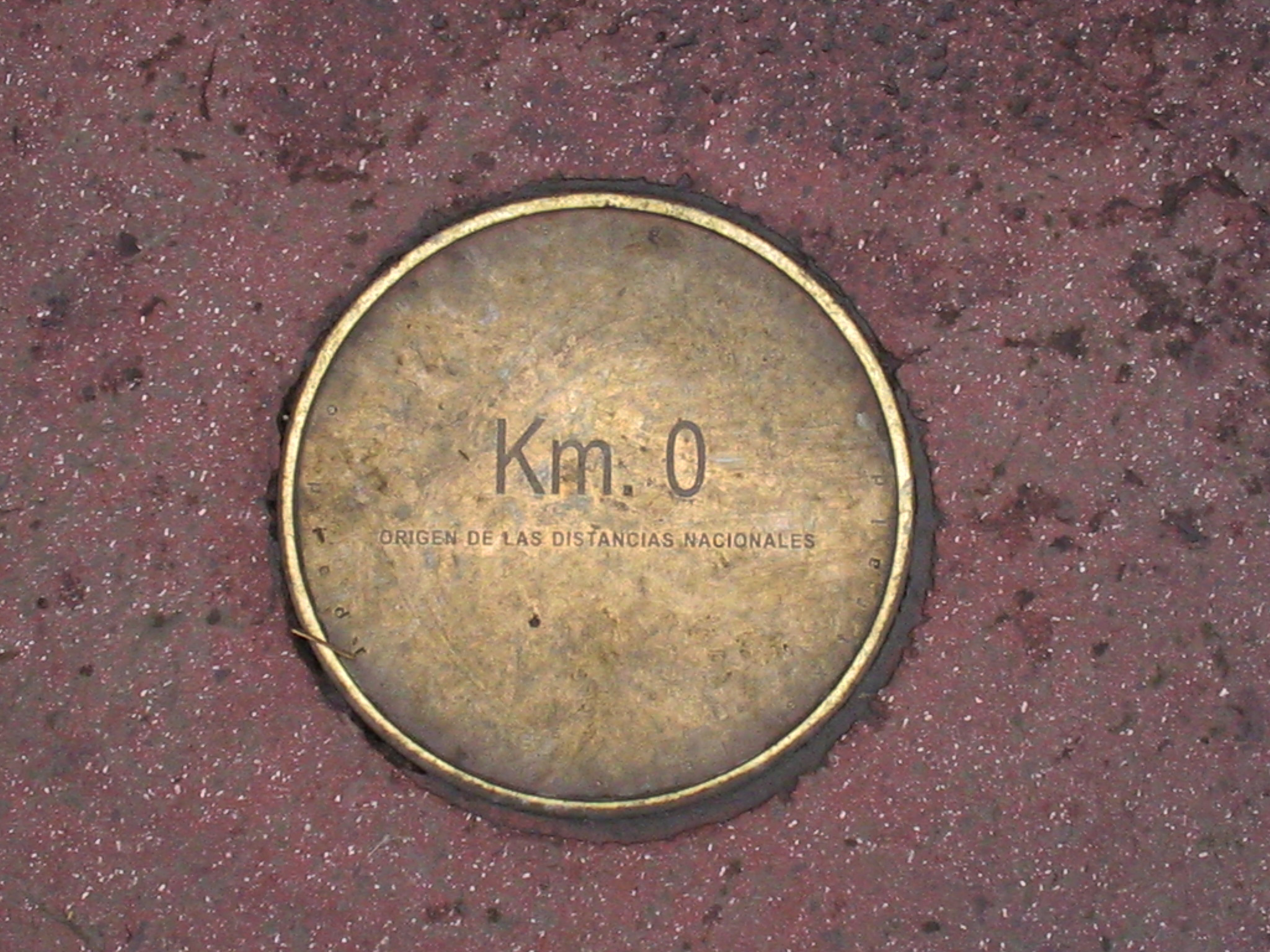
Kilometre Zero at Plaza de Armas, Santiago

All national distances from Santiago, the capital of Chile, originate at the Km. 0 plaque at the Plaza de Armas main square in its downtown. (Coordinates: 33.4378°S 70.6505°W.)

Chile's Autopista Central – Eje Norte-Sur (the eastern segment of the Panamerican Highway that passes through Santiago) has its kilometre zero at the intersection with the Alameda del Libertador Bernardo O'Higgins, the capital's main avenue. (Coordinates: 33.4462°S 70.6607°W.)

=== China ===
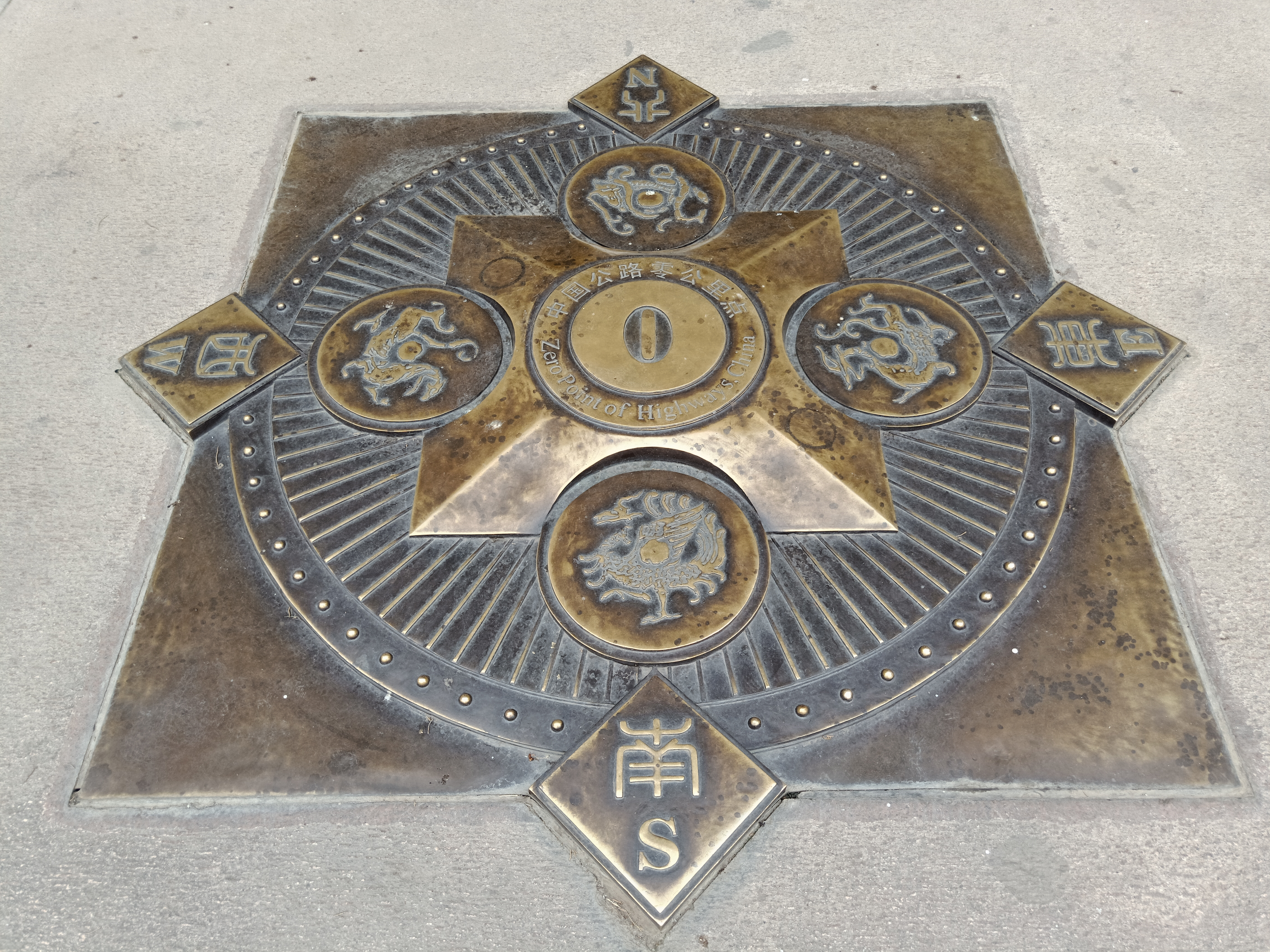
The kilometre zero point for highways, Beijing

China Railway's kilometre zero is at the entrance to the Fengtai Yard on the Beijing–Guangzhou railway just outside its capital Beijing. This point was historically the start of the line; the marker is a simple concrete marker, with "0" painted on it. There is no ceremonial plaque.

The kilometre zero point for highways is at Tiananmen Square, just outside the Zhengyangmen Gate. It is marked with a plaque in the ground, with the four cardinal points, four animals, and "Zero Point of Highways, China" in English and Chinese.

=== Cuba ===
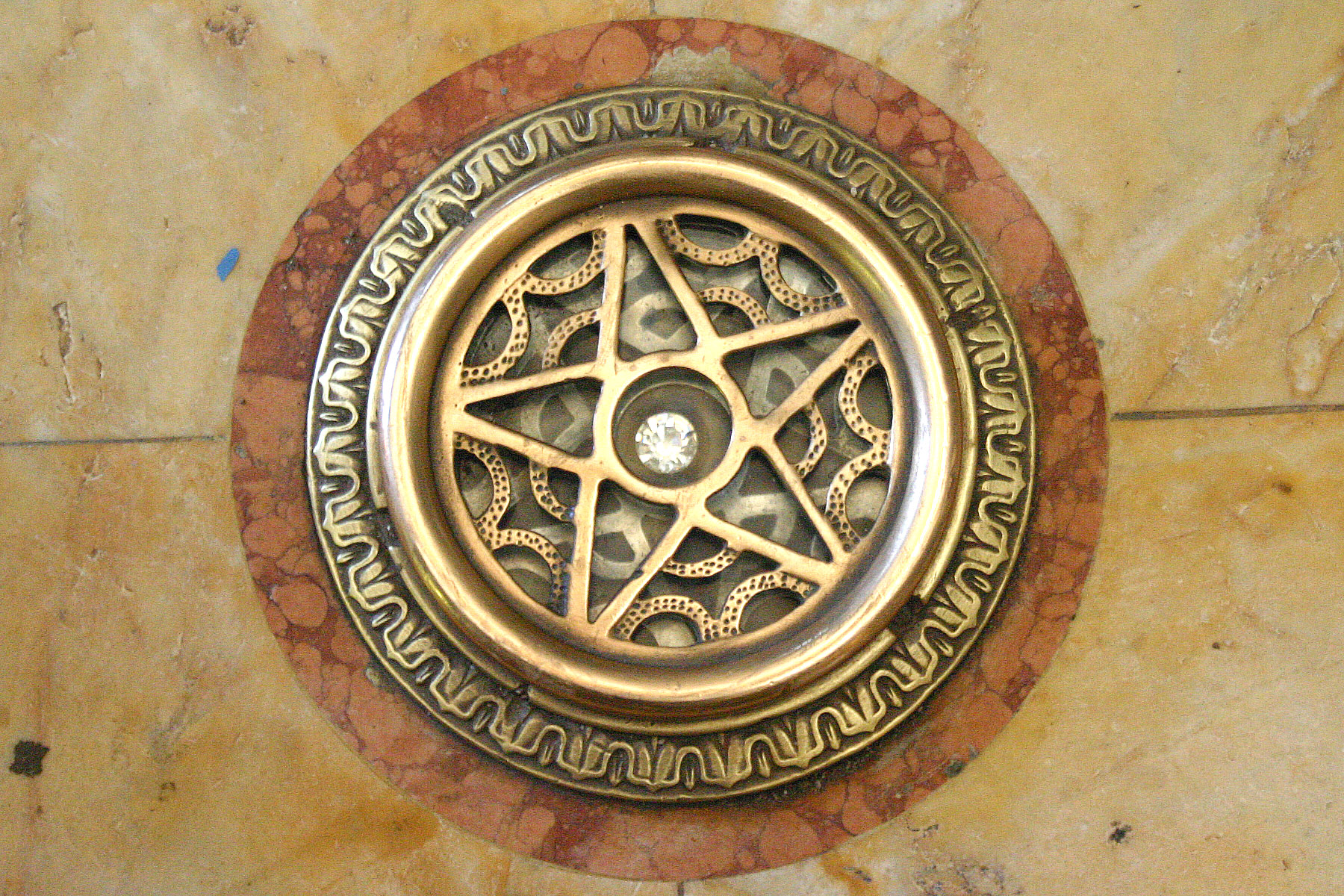
The diamond in El Capitolio, Havana, marking the Cuban Kilometre Zero

Cuba's kilometre zero is in its capital Havana in El Capitolio. Embedded in the floor in the centre of the main hall is a replica 25 carats (5.0 g) diamond, which marks kilometre zero. The original diamond, said to have belonged to Tsar Nicholas II of Russia and have been sold to the Cuban state by a Turkish merchant, was stolen on March 25, 1946, and mysteriously returned to the President, Ramón Grau San Martín, on June 2, 1946. It was replaced in El Capitolio by a replica in 1973.

=== Denmark ===
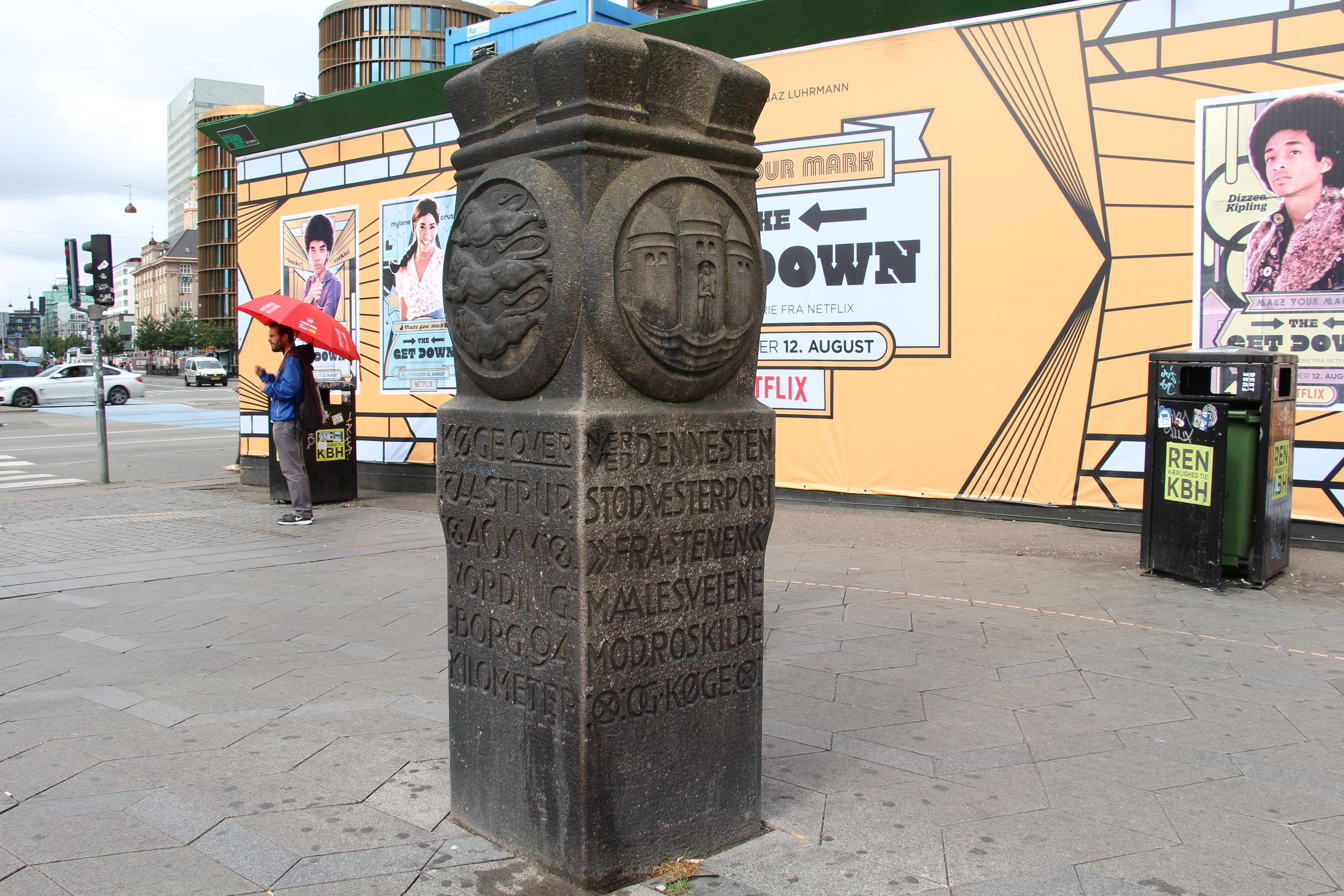
Copenhagen Zero Kilometre Stone at City Hall Square

Traditionally, distances to Copenhagen, Denmark's capital, were measured to the old city gates. City Hall Square (old Vesterport) is the zero point for roads from south and west such as from Korsør or Rødby. For road from north such as from Helsingør or Hillerød, point zero is Østerport located on the North side of the inner city. Nørreport was used from Frederikssund, and Amagerport from Amager. There are old monuments at these locations. On railways distances are in general measured from Copenhagen Central Station.

=== Dominican Republic ===
DR-1, DR-2, and DR-3 all depart from kilometre zero at Santo Domingo's Parque de Independencia.

=== Egypt ===
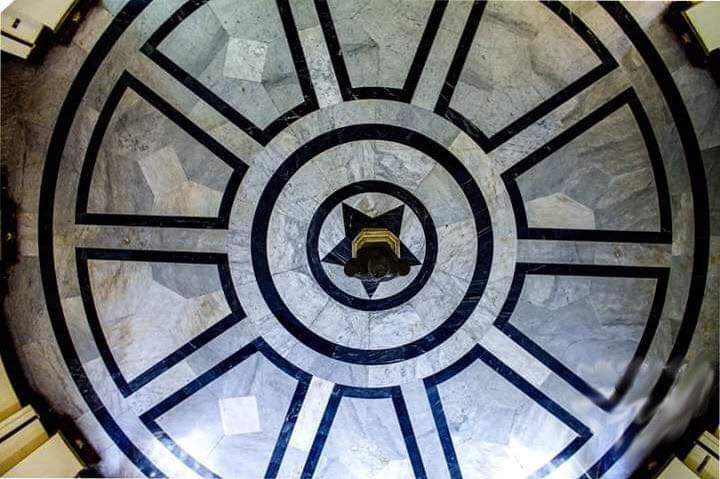
Outer Hall of Egypt Post's Museum which was the first post office in Khedivial Cairo with Star shaped ground

Kilometre zero in Cairo, Egypt is at the Attaba Square Post Office in 1st of Abdel Khaliq Sarwat Pasha Street.

=== Ethiopia ===
Kilometre zero in Ethiopia is in Menelik II Square, Addis Ababa, in front of St. George's Cathedral; it is the point from which all Ethiopian highway distances are measured. The point was designated by Emperor Haile Selassie in 1930.

=== Finland ===
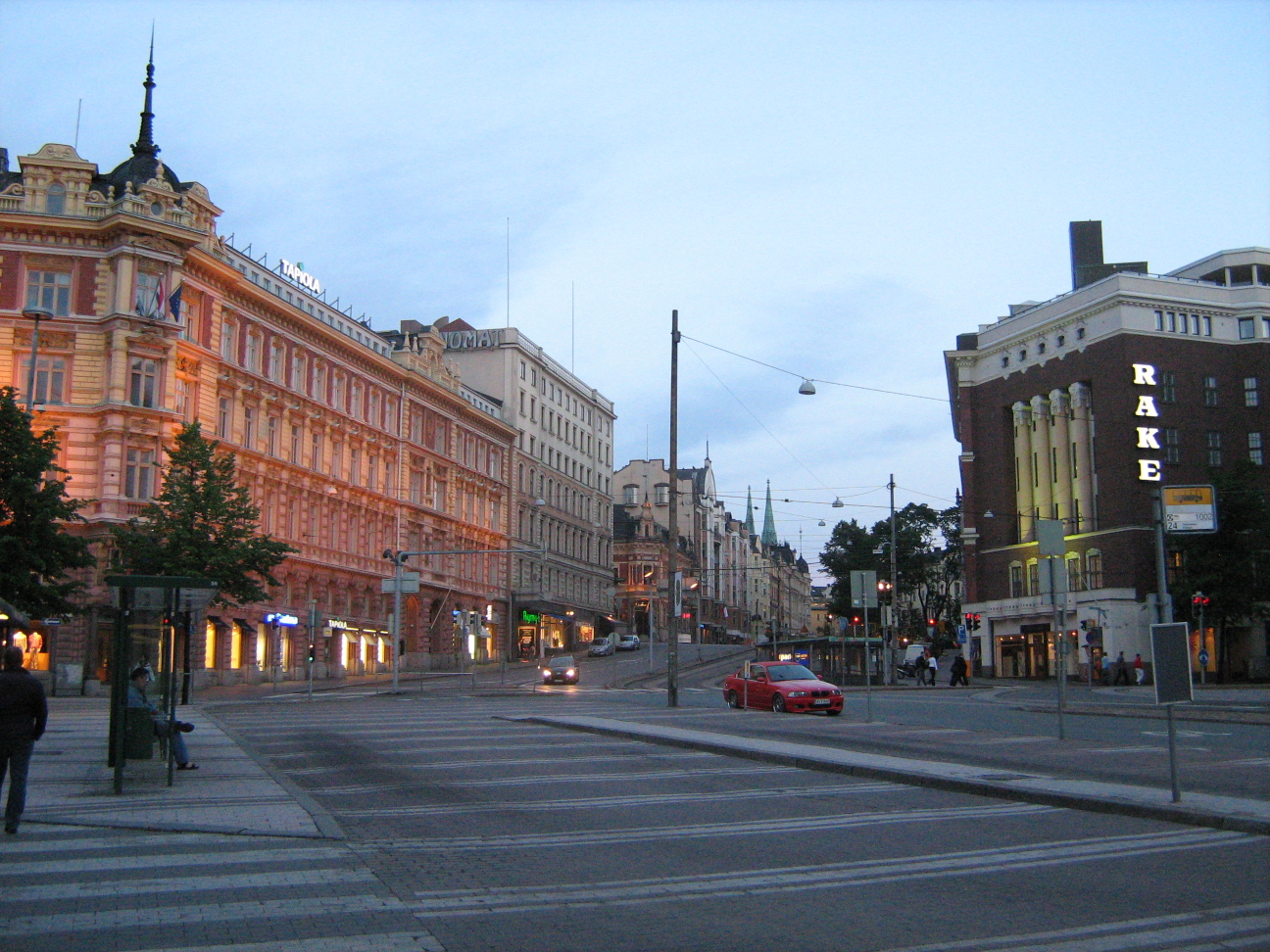
Erottaja Square in Helsinki

Kilometre zero in Finland is at the Erottaja square in central Helsinki.

=== France ===
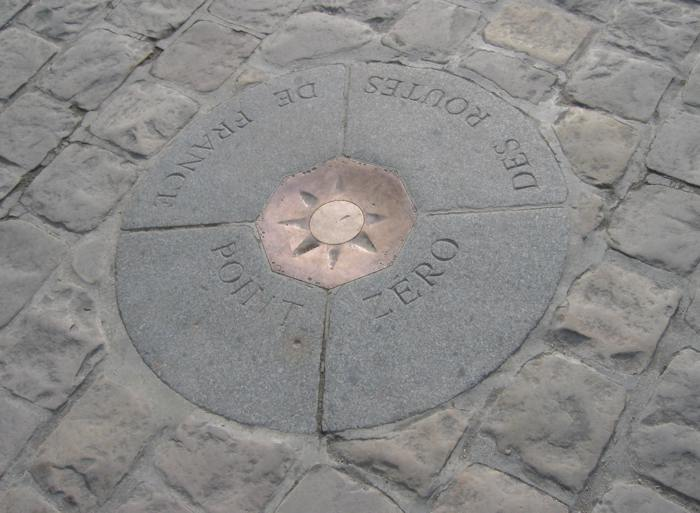
Point Zero of the French highways

Point zero of the French national highways is located in the city square of Parvis Notre-Dame – Place Jean-Paul II of Paris facing the main entrance of Notre-Dame with the medallion installed in 1924. (Coordinates: 48.8534°N 2.3488°E). It was established by King Louis XV in April 1769.

A commemorative kilometre zero for the Liberty Road was erected in Sainte-Mère-Eglise, liberated by U.S. paratroopers on 6 June 1944.

=== Germany ===
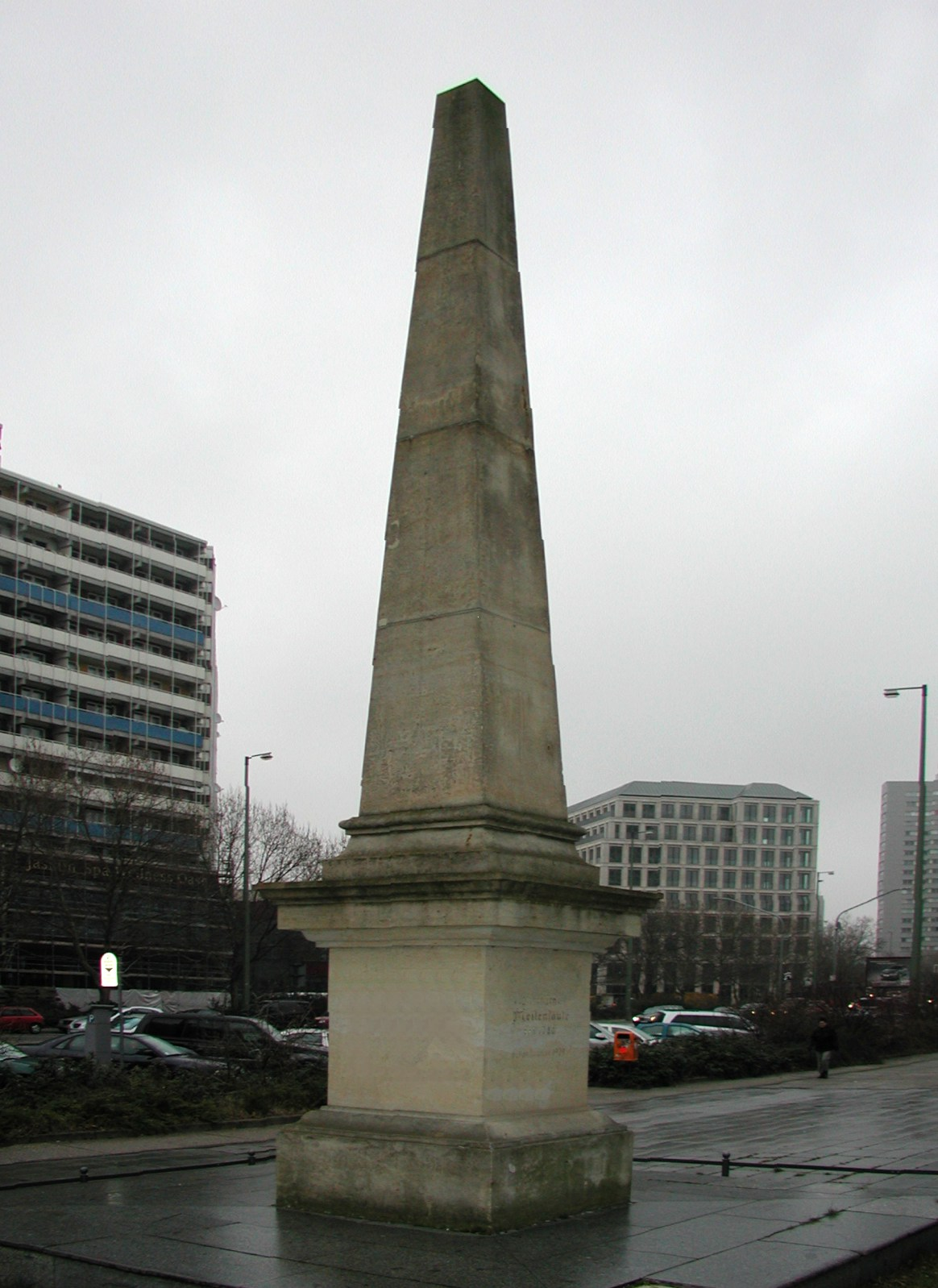
Reconstructed milestone in Berlin

Initially, the origin point of all Prussian roads leading to and from the capital Berlin was at Dönhoff-Platz in the city centre (1730–1875) and in 1975 a reconstructed milestone was placed at 52.5108°N 13.3990°E in front of the Spittelkolonnaden at Marion-Gräfin-Dönhoff-Platz.

=== Great Britain ===
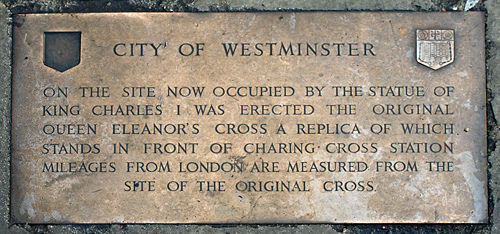
Plaque at the original site of Charing Cross, now the site of the Charles I statue

In the centre of Charing Cross in London, there is a plaque bearing the inscription:

On the site now occupied by the statue of King Charles I was erected the original Queen Eleanor's Cross, a replica of which stands in front of Charing Cross station. Mileages from London are measured from the site of the original cross.

In Scotland, distances from Edinburgh are measured from a bollard in front of the General Post Office building in Princes Street.

For most mainline railways, miles are measured from the associated London terminal station.

The 0 km point for the whole London Underground network is located at Ongar railway station which is actually no longer part of the network and is only operated as part of a heritage railway.

See also:

- London Stone — possibly the Roman zero point
- Hicks Hall — traditionally the start of the Great North Road
- St Mary-le-Bow — the church traditionally the zero point of the road to Lewes in Sussex.
- The Standard — a water pump in Cornhill which was previously used as a zero point

=== Greece ===
In Ancient Greece, distances were measured from the Altar of the Twelve Gods in the ancient agora of Athens. So, that altar can be considered the first kilometre zero in human history.

Nowadays, the kilometre zero for Greek highways is the National Observatory of Athens.

=== Guatemala ===
The kilometre zero is located at the National Palace in Guatemala City. The National Palace is also the residence for the Guatemalan president.

=== Hong Kong ===
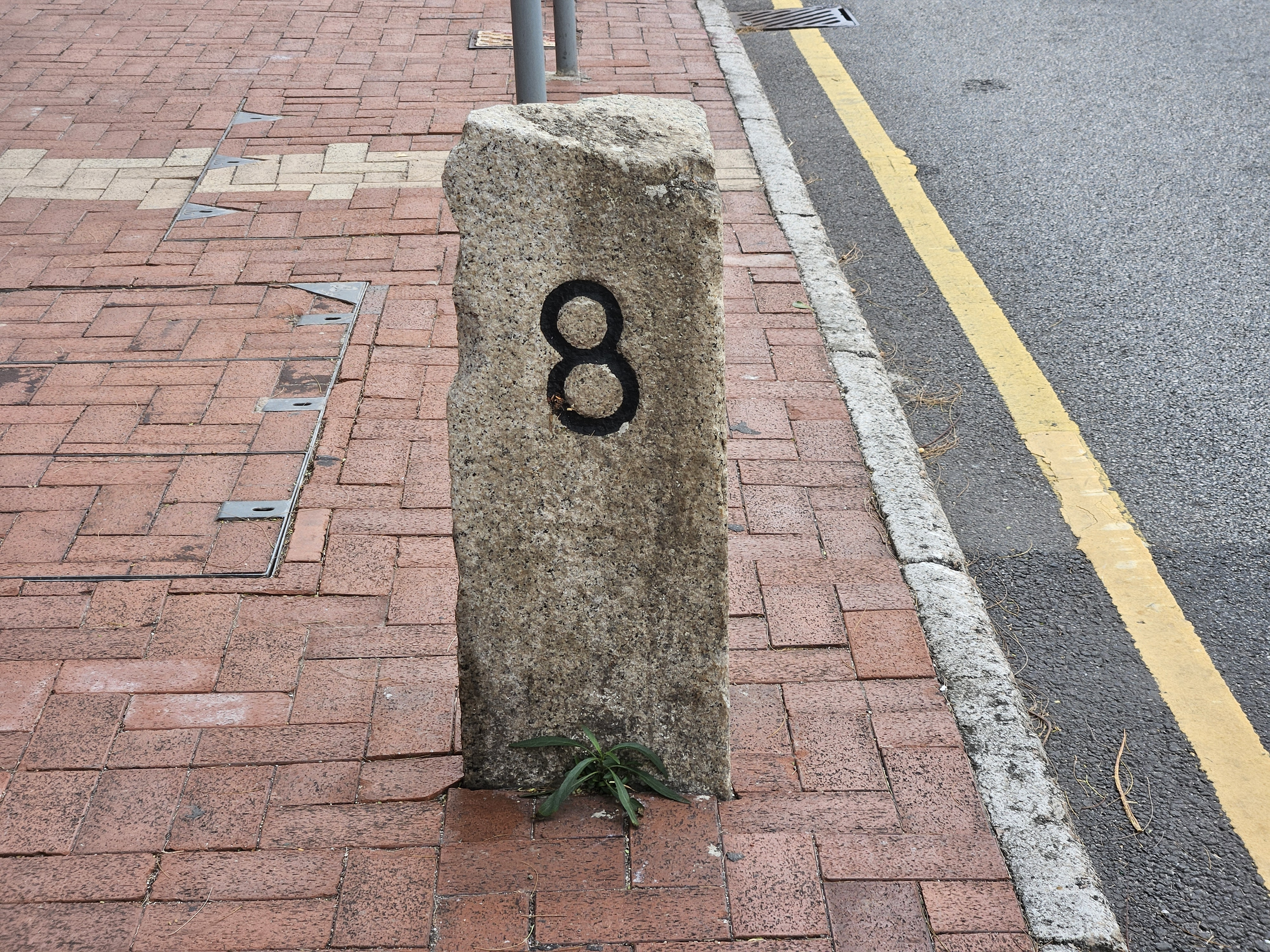
8-mile milestone on Castle Peak Road, Hong Kong

Traditionally, milestones for Castle Peak Road, Tai Po Road and Clear Water Bay Road, the first three highways extending from the city centre in Kowloon to the rural areas, were all measured from the Star Ferry pier at Tsim Sha Tsui. There are still milestones preserved today but there is no Milestone 0.

However, modern highways in Hong Kong no longer use this system. Each trunk route has its own km 0 at one end.

=== Hungary ===
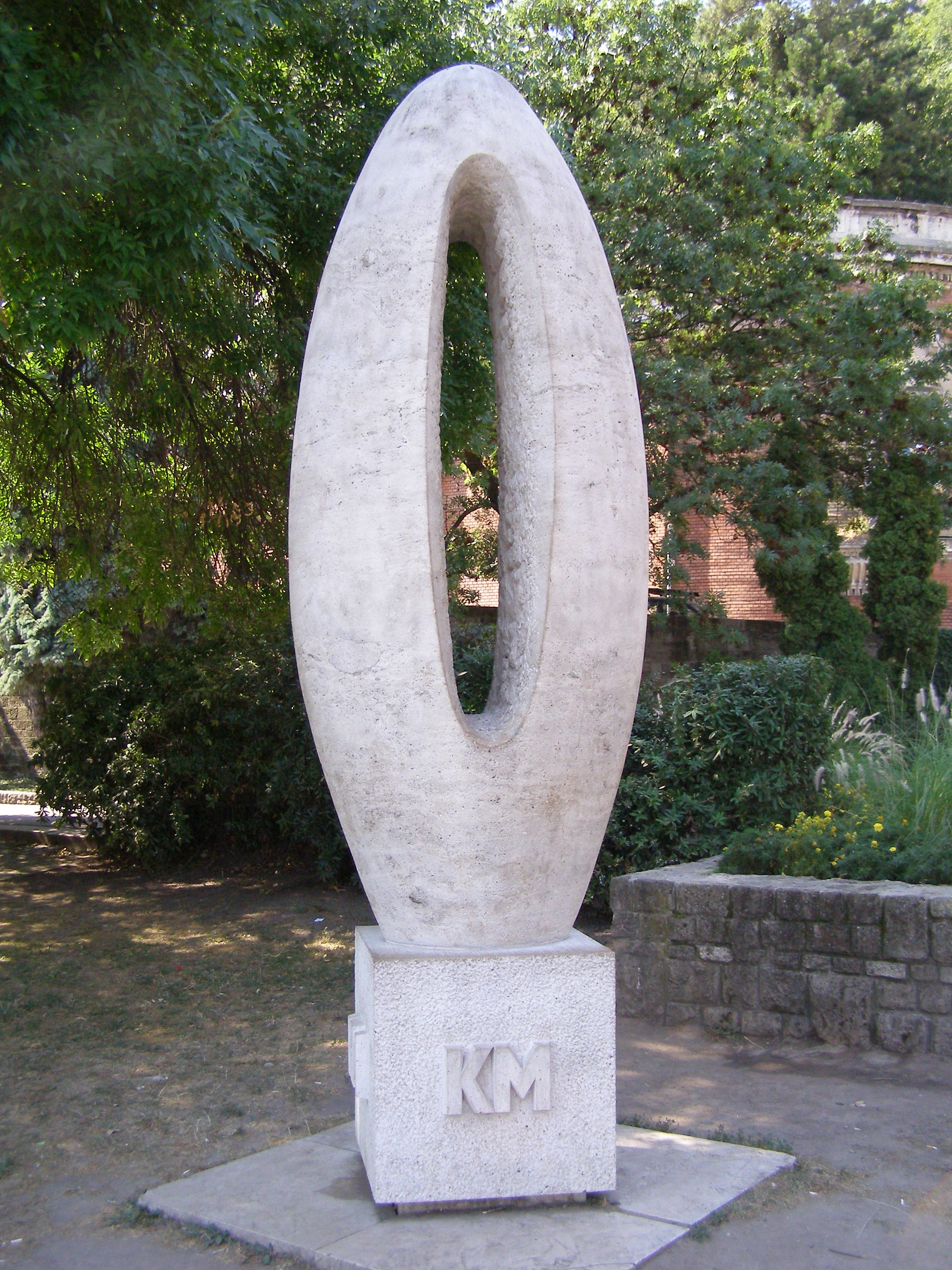
Hungary's Kilometre Zero

The Zero Kilometre Stone in Budapest, the capital of Hungary, is marked by a monument, forming the number "zero". The starting point was initially reckoned from the threshold of the Buda Royal Palace, but it was taken down to the Széchenyi Chain Bridge when it was built in 1849.

The city of Kecskemét also has a zero kilometre stone on Kossuth Square.

=== India ===
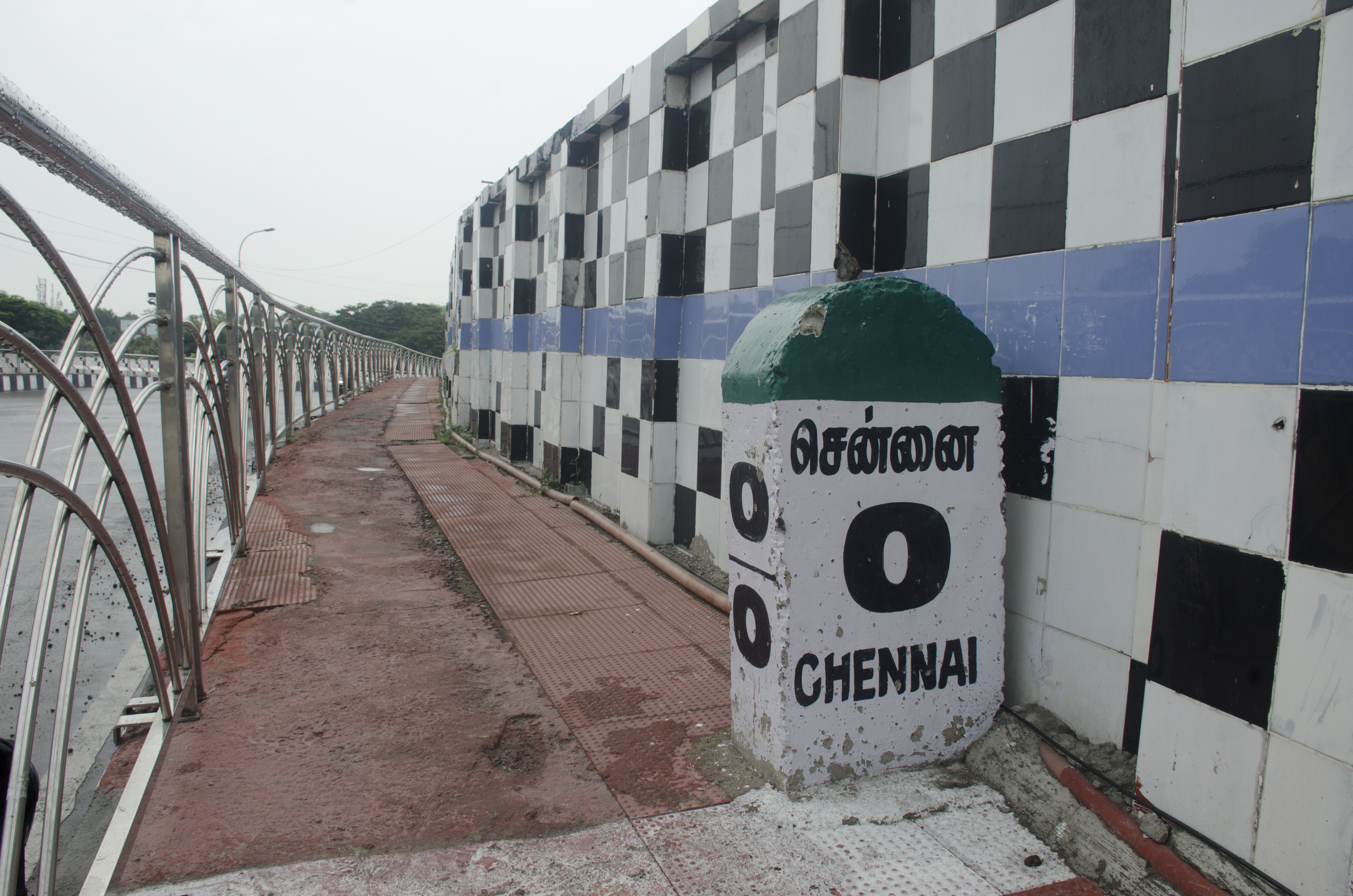
Zero Milestone, Chennai

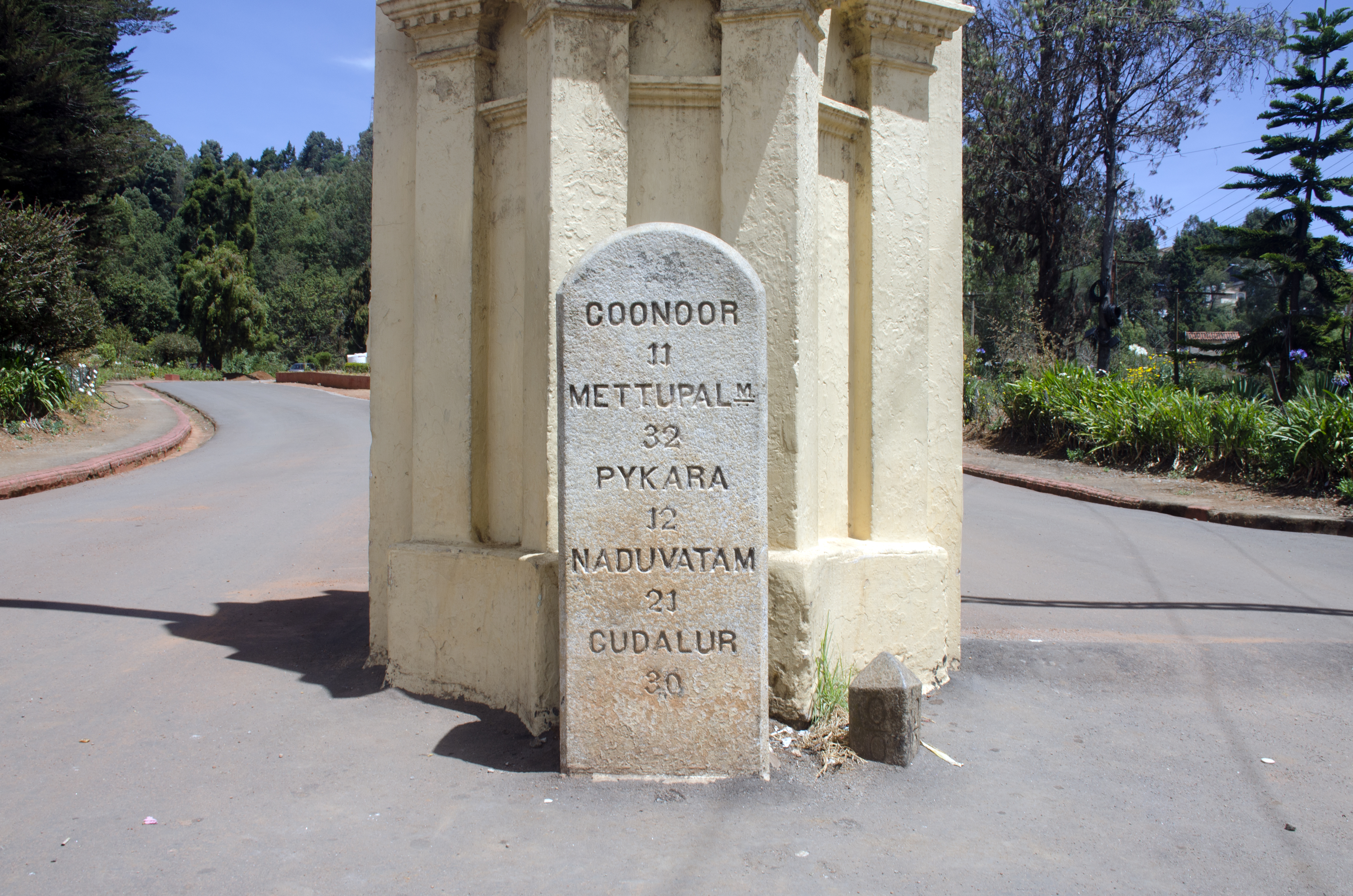
Zero Milestone, Ooty

In India, the Zero Mile Stone is a monument in the city of Nagpur, Maharashtra. The Zero Mile Stone was erected by the British Raj after the Great Trigonometric Survey in 1907, and consists of four horses and a pillar made of sandstone. There is no verifiable evidence that it is a monument locating the geographical center of colonial India in the city of Nagpur, or that the Zero Mile Stone was erected by the British to use this point to measure all the distances. Incidentally, the city of Nagpur lies geographically central to all the nine major metros of India, viz. Ahmedabad, Bangalore, Chennai, Hyderabad, Kochi, Mumbai, Kolkata, New Delhi and Pune. Most kilometre zeroes in India are situated near churches.

- In Mumbai, the zero point used to be at St. Thomas Cathedral, near Horniman Circle. The original zero-milestone has long gone missing. Today a plaque marks the exact location and narrates the history.
- In Chennai, kilometre zero is at the midpoint of Muthuswamy Bridge on Muthuswamy Road near the Chennai Fort railway station on the south-western side of Fort St. George.
- In Pune, kilometer zero is located on the boundary wall of the General Post Office (GPO). It was initially half buried under layers of concrete. In 2017, the concrete was removed and the entire zero-milestone was revealed. The street along the zero-milestone was turned into a street museum with several installations depicting the history of the Great Trigonometrical Survey. Many of the installations have been broken.
- In Ooty (Ootacamund or Udagamandalam), kilometer zero is located at the gate of St. Stephen's Church. Here, the zero stone and the milestone can be seen.

=== Indonesia ===
- The Kilometre zero of Indonesia is marked by the monument in Weh Island in Aceh, the northernmost and westernmost point of Indonesia. It was one of the rare cases where the national kilometre zero is not at the capital (in this case, Jakarta).
- Previously it was further north in Rondo Island. Due to access difficulties, it was decided to move it to Weh Island.

=== Ireland ===
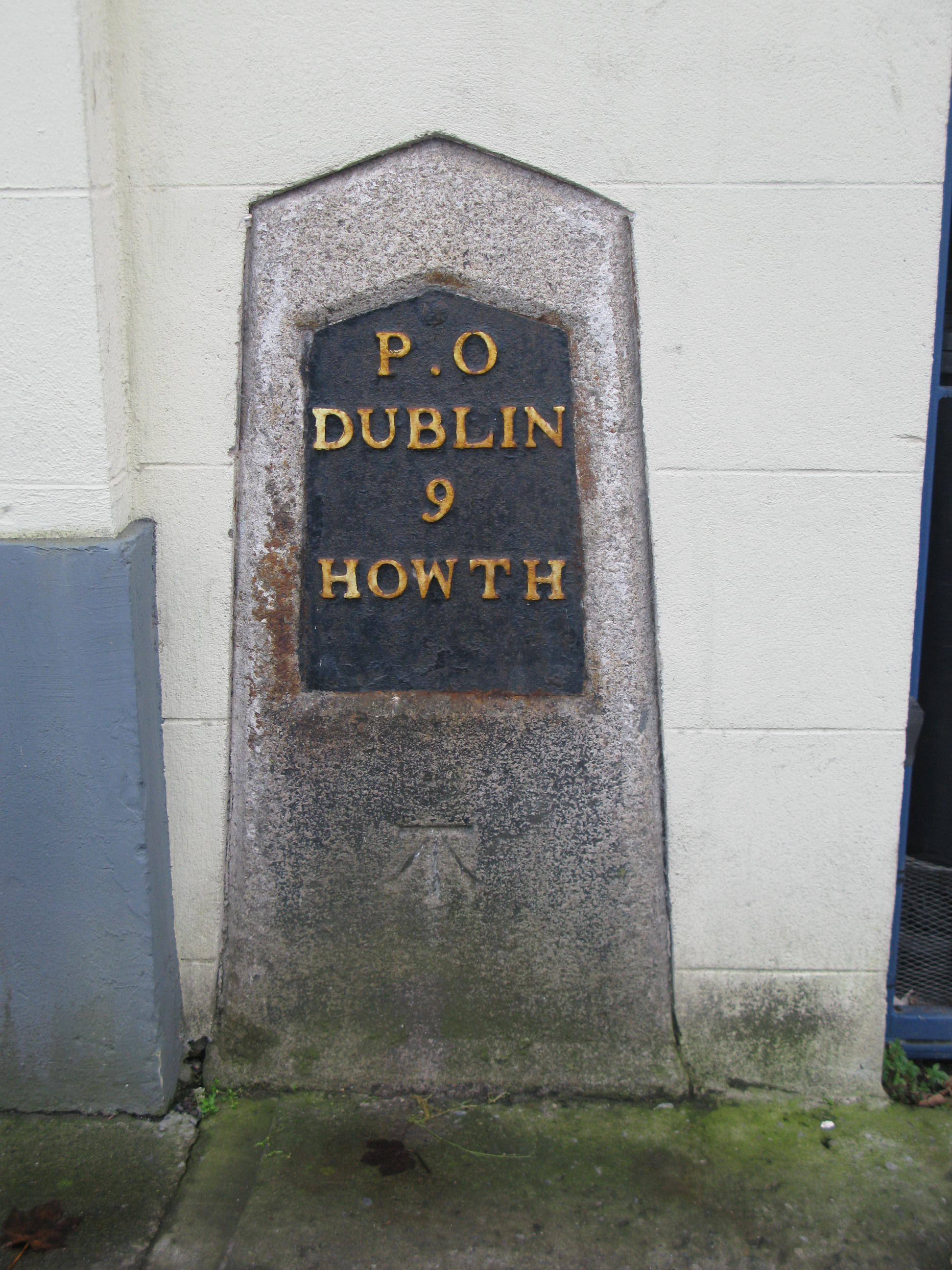
Howth is 9 miles (14 km) from the General Post Office, Dublin

In Ireland, distances from its capital Dublin are measured from the General Post Office on the city's main thoroughfare, O'Connell Street.

=== Israel ===
In Jerusalem, its kilometre zero or zero point is at Jaffa Gate. Some say it is at The Garden Tomb. However, there is no precise marker, as of today. However, the Railway system uses a different kilometre zero point at the former Haifa East railway station.

=== Italy ===
The Italian kilometre zero is on the top of the Capitoline Hill in Rome.

=== Japan ===
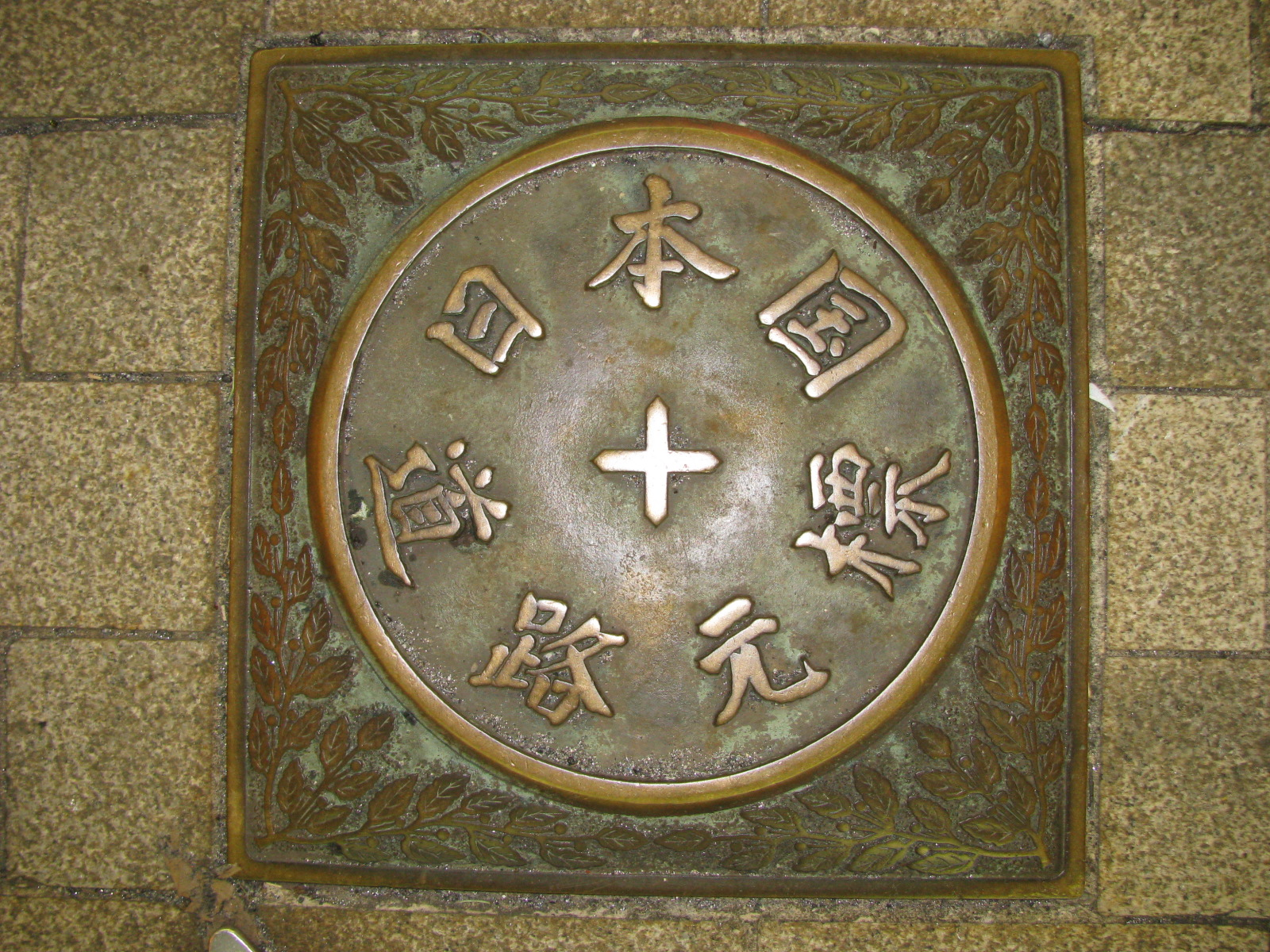
Kilometre Zero of Japan on the Nihonbashi Bridge in Tokyo

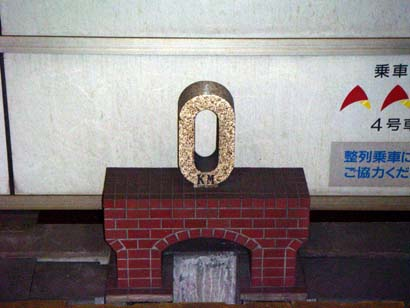
0 kilometer post at Tokyo Station for the Chūō Main Line near Car 4.

Kilometre zero in Japan (日本国道路元標, Nipponkoku Dōro Genpyō) is on the middle of Nihonbashi bridge in Tokyo, the capital city of Japan. Tokyo Station is considered the originating point of the national railway network and has several posts and monuments indicating kilometre zero for lines originating from the station.

=== Kyrgyzstan ===
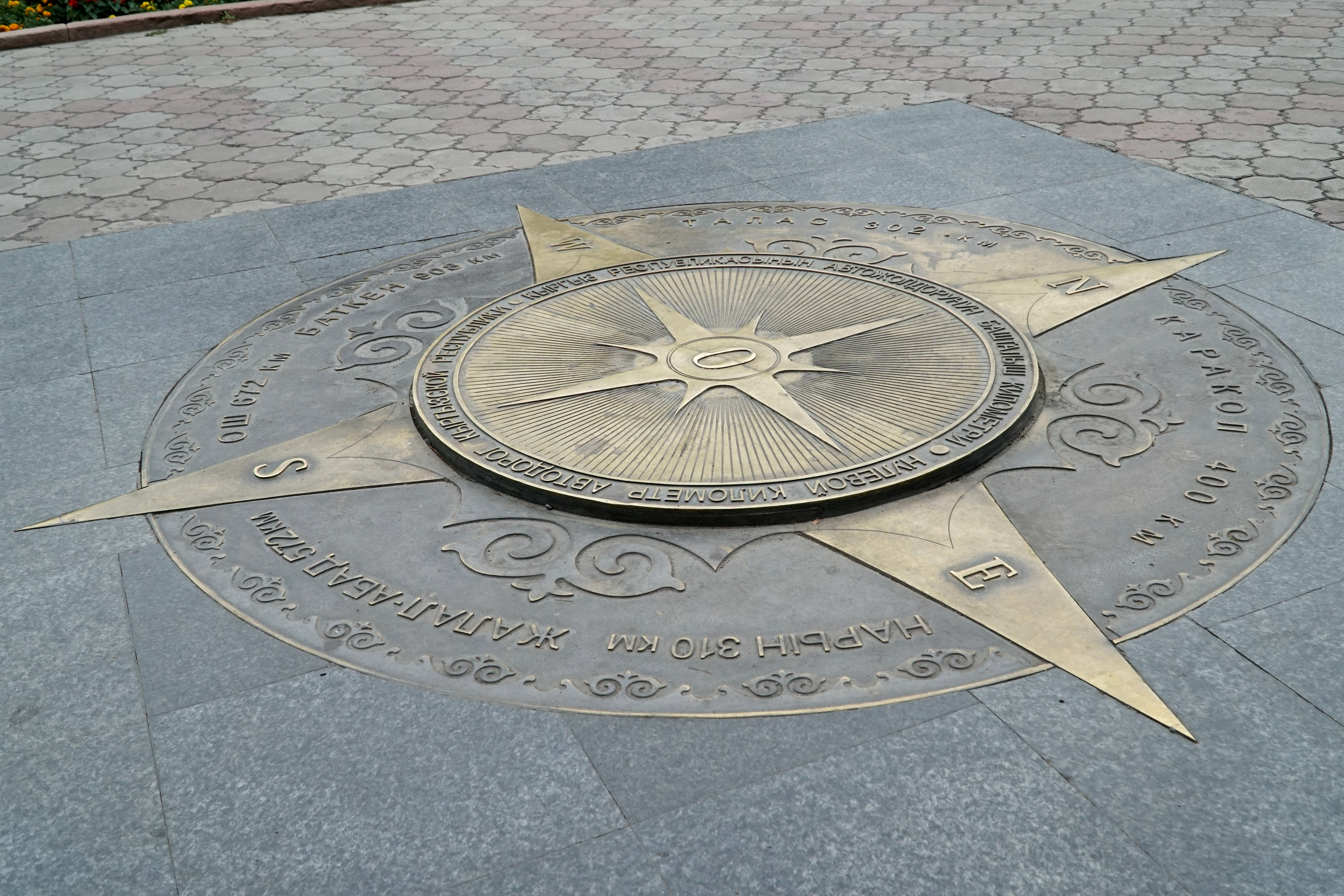
Bishkek

The kilometre zero in Kyrgyzstan is located in its capital Bishkek, at 42°52′35.8″N 74°36′25.4″E

=== Madagascar ===
Kilometre zero for the major roads radiating from Antananarivo, the capital of Madagascar, is on the square in front of the Soarano Railway Station.

=== Malaysia ===
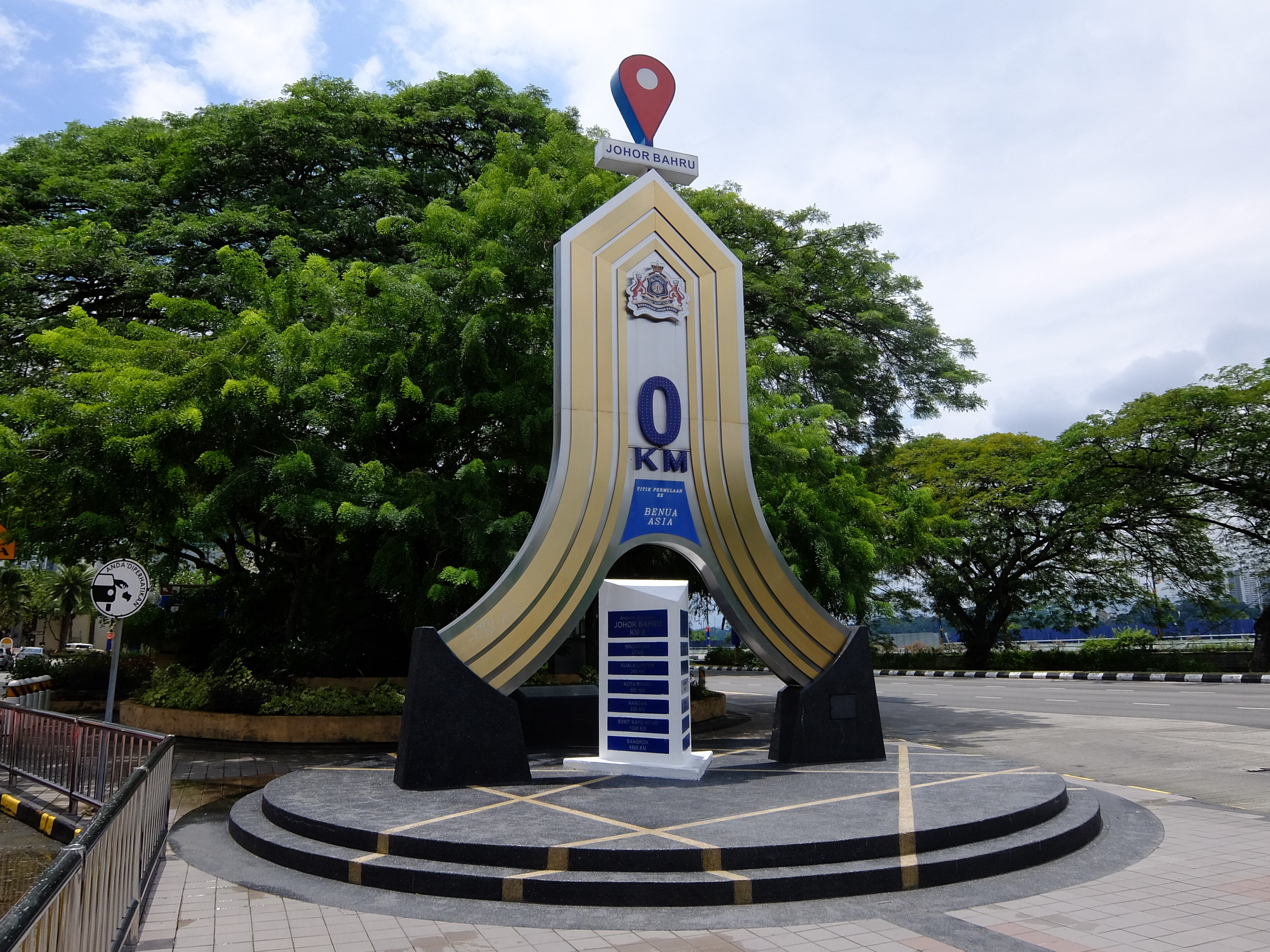
Kilometre Zero at Johor Bahru

Kilometre zero for roads and highways in Peninsular Malaysia is located in front of Johor Bahru General Post Office. It is one of the rare cases where the national kilometre zero is not at the capital (in this case, Kuala Lumpur) due to the fact that the distances for three major backbone routes (Federal Routes 1, 3 and 5) are measured from Johor Bahru, where they meet. In addition, Kuala Lumpur has its own Zero Mile marker as a point of reference from the capital city.

In Sarawak, kilometre zero of Pan Borneo Highway started in Telok Melano. In Sabah, the starting point for Kota Kinabalu City's kilometre zero began in front of the Sabah Tourism Board building, which used to be a post office during the British colonial era.

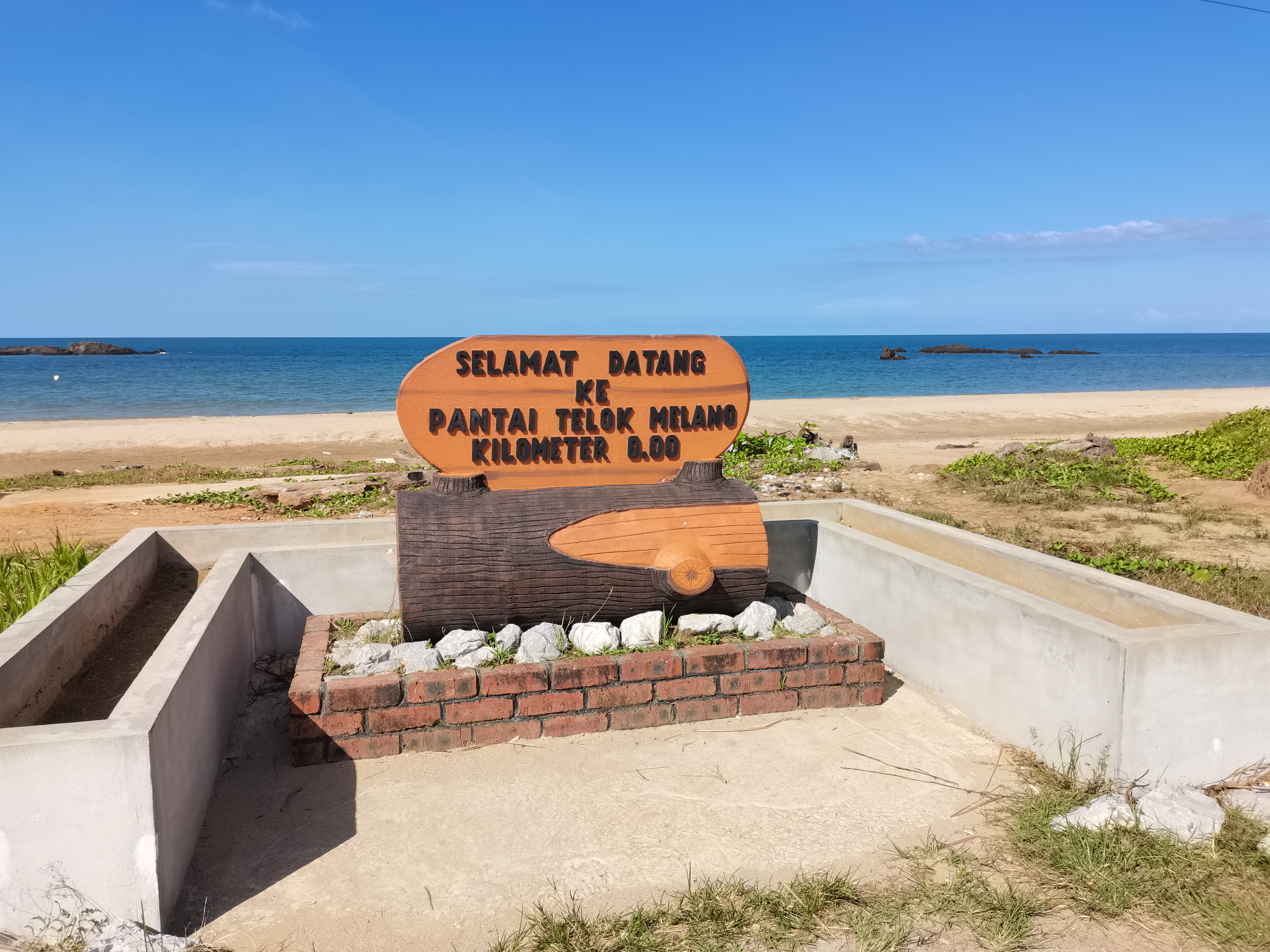
Kilometre Zero at Telok Melano

=== Mexico ===
Kilometre zero of Mexico is located next to the Mexico City Metropolitan Cathedral in Mexico City.

=== North Korea ===
The North Korean kilometre zero is at Kim Il-sung Square in the capital Pyongyang.

=== Norway ===
Kilometre zero for roads from Oslo, the capital of Norway, is at the address Observatoriegata 1. Kilometre zero for most railways in Norway is 0.27 kilometres (0.17 mi) westwards into the Oslo Tunnel, based on the location of the former Oslo East Station.

=== Panama ===
The Panamanian kilometre zero is at the Martin Sosa Bridge on the Simon Bolivar Avenue (Transisthmian Highway) in the capital Panama City.

=== Pakistan ===
The Pakistani zero point is the Zero Point Interchange in Islamabad, the capital of Pakistan. It is the busiest interchange of Islamabad.

=== Philippines ===
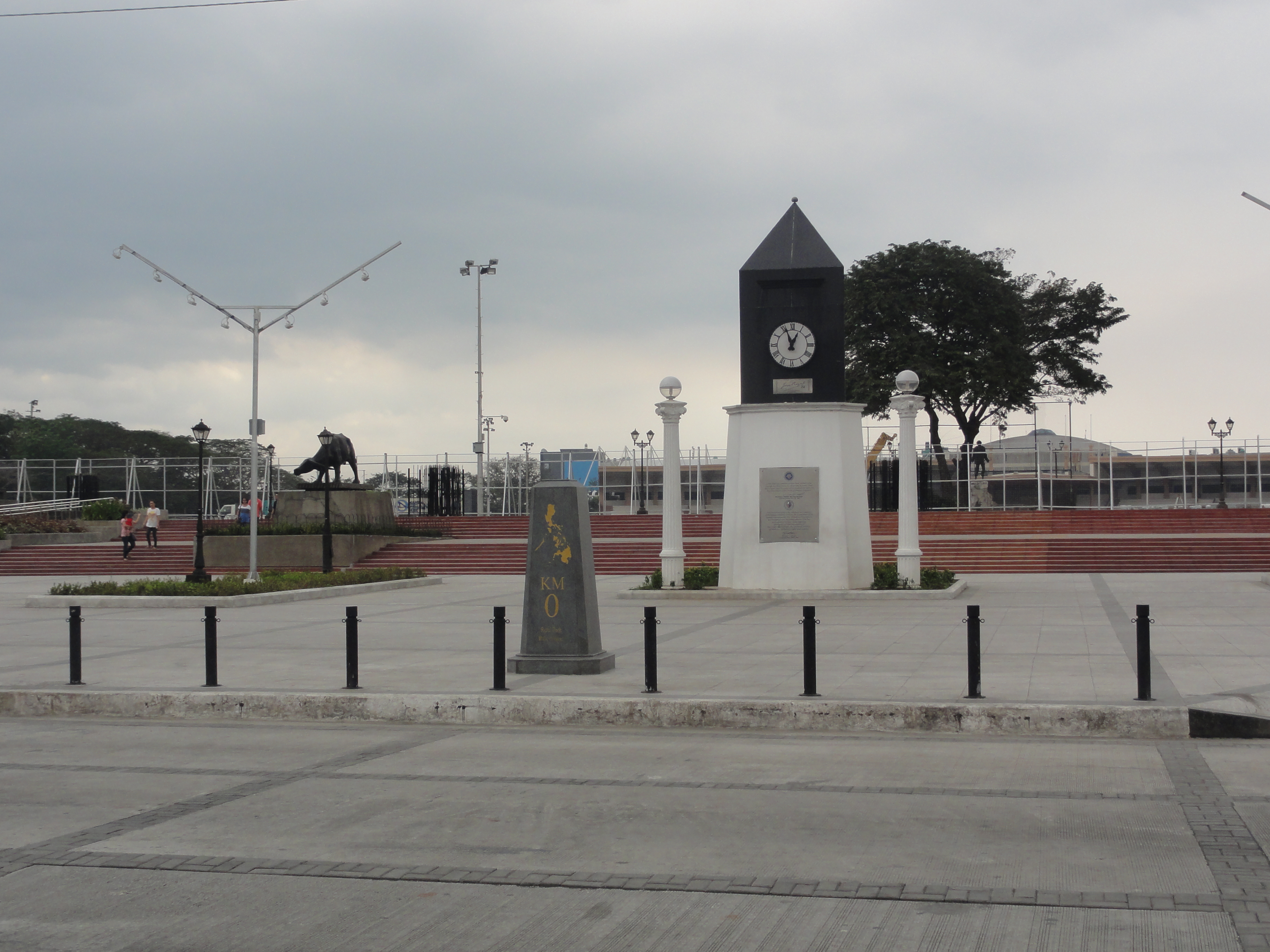
Current Philippine Kilometre Zero in Rizal Park, Manila

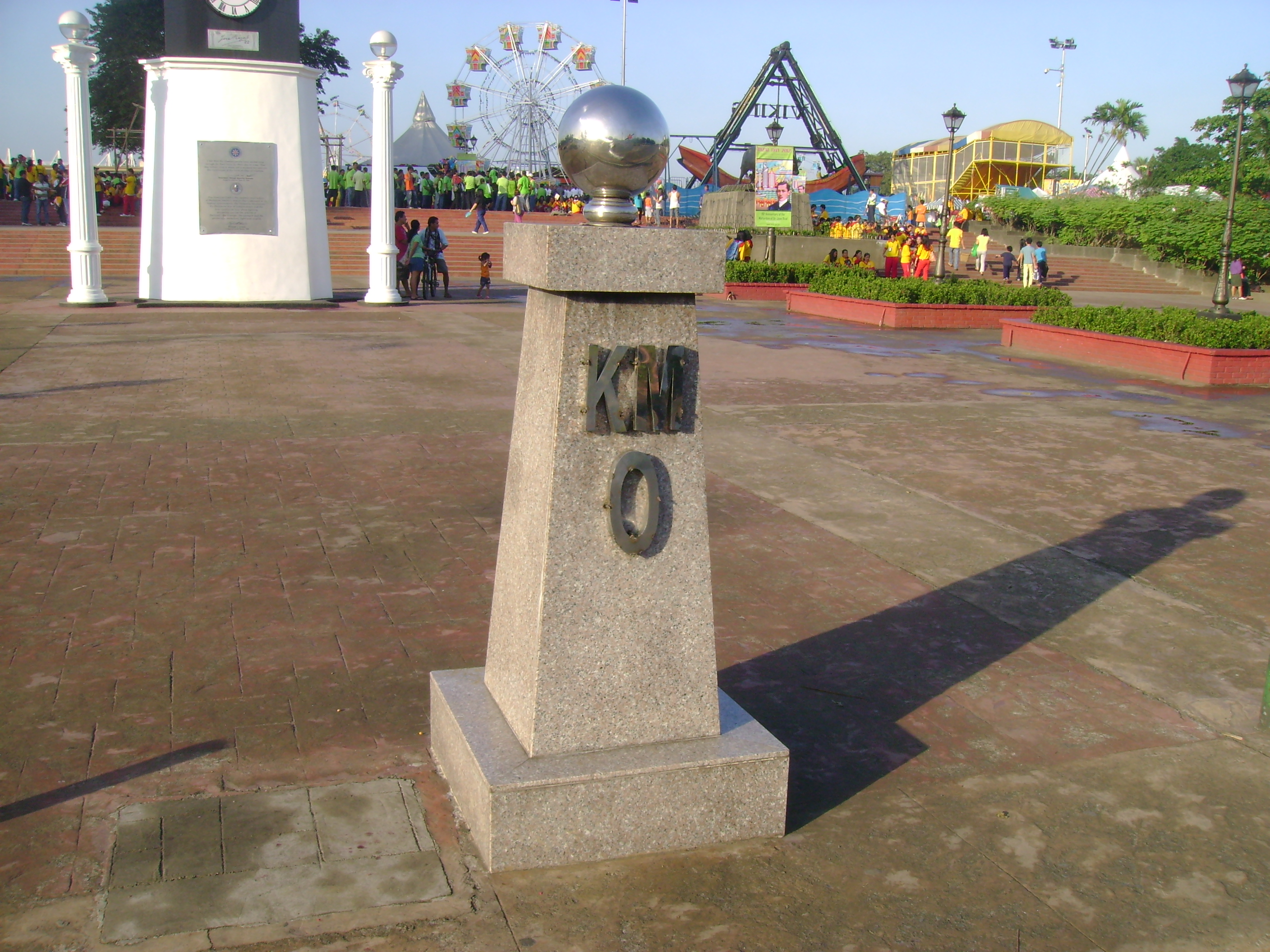
Old Philippine Kilometre Zero that was replaced, also in Rizal Park

A small obelisk located near Rizal Monument of Rizal Park in Manila, the capital city of the Philippines, serves as kilometre zero for the island of Luzon; this obelisk replaced a marker with a small metal sphere atop the marker sometime during the 2010s. The marker also serves as point of reference, via the Pan-Philippine Highway, for the islands of Samar, Leyte, and Mindanao, although Leyte and Mindanao have their own kilometre zero markers in front of the old Leyte Provincial Capitol, Tacloban and in Marawi, respectively.

For all the other islands, kilometre zero is located at the front of provincial capitol buildings or municipal halls, ports, town centres, or major junctions. For instance, in Cebu, it is in front of the Cebu Provincial Capitol, while in Panay, it is the Arroyo Fountain in front of the Casa Real de Iloilo. Three islands of Batanes also have their respective kilometres zero. Negros Oriental and Occidental each have their respective kilometre zero markers, even though they are both within the island of Negros. Baguio also has its kilometre zero as a reference point to and from the city.

Prior to World War II, the entire archipelago only had one kilometre zero – the cross atop the media naranja dome crossing of the Manila Cathedral.

=== Poland ===
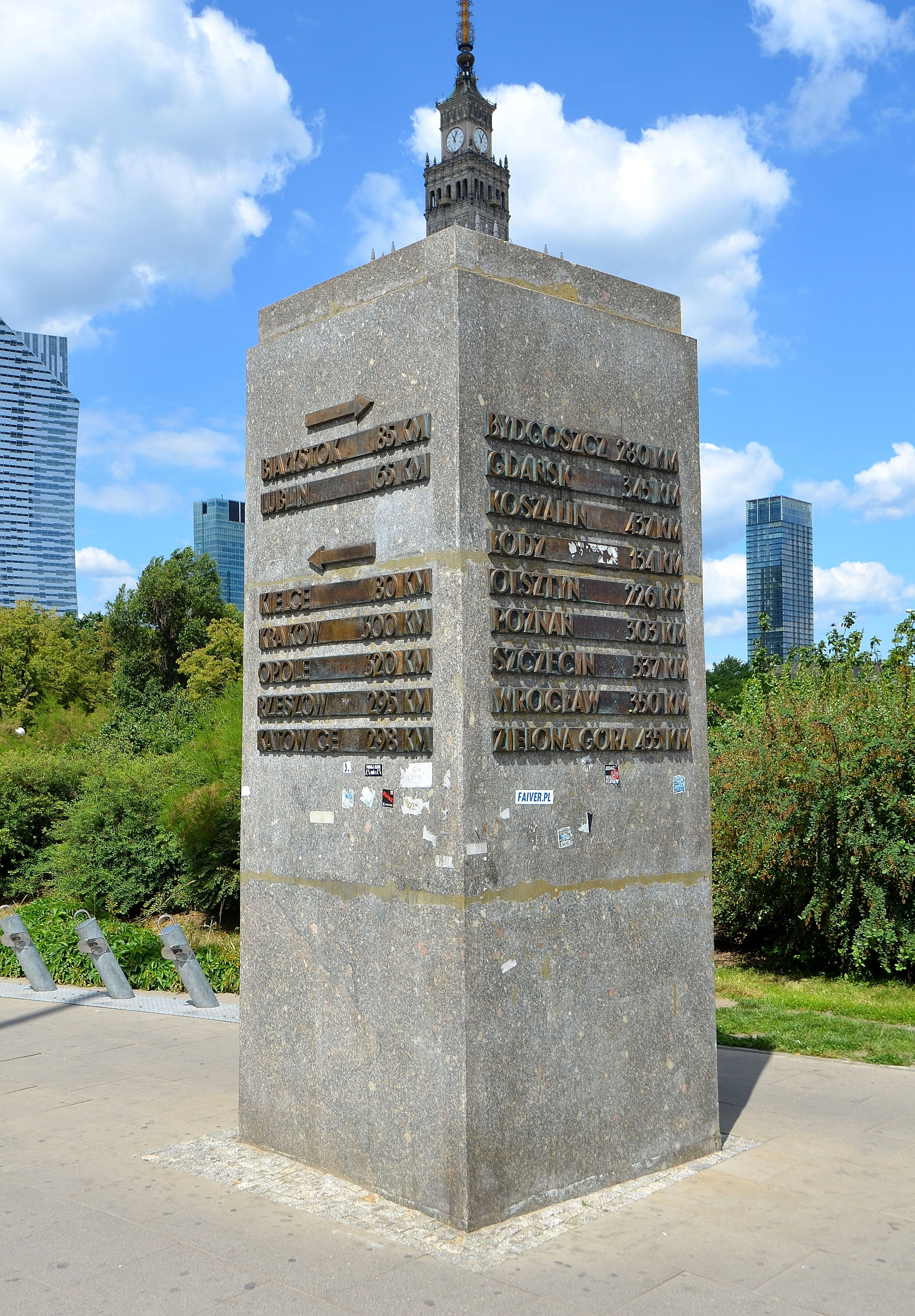
Warsaw

Warsaw, the capital of Poland, has a meeting point featuring plaques with distances from it to other major cities of the country. It is placed on the intersection of the city's two main avenues, Aleje Jerozolimskie and Marszałkowska Street, next to the Centrum Warsaw Metro station.

=== Portugal ===
Portugal does not have a physical kilometre zero marker, but distances in origin-destinations matrices involving the capital Lisbon use the Rossio square as kilometre zero.

=== Romania ===
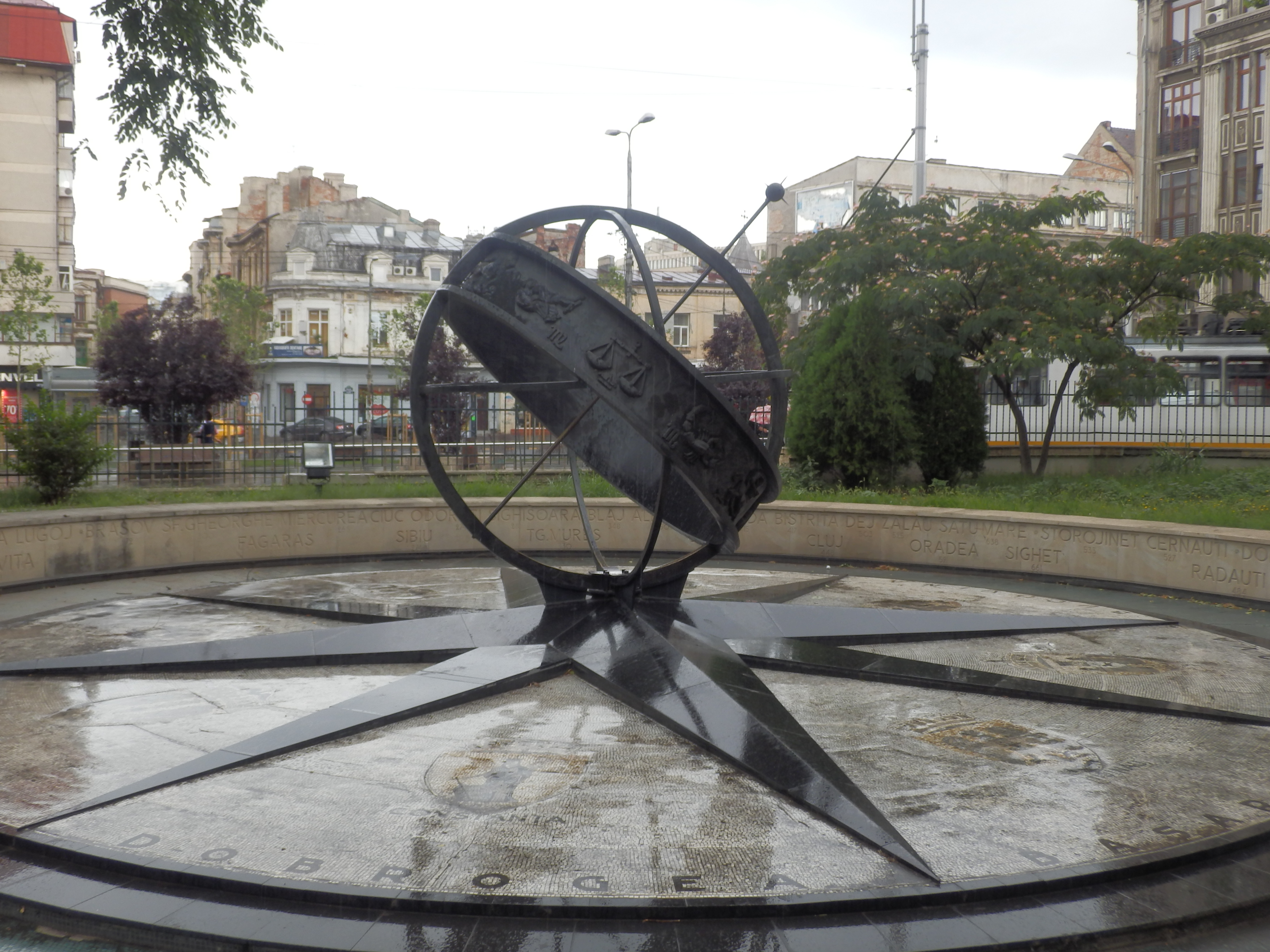
Bucharest

Romania's kilometre zero is marked by a monument next to Saint George's Church in Bucharest, which was built in 1938.

The distances from Bucharest to other cities in Romania are measured from this monument. It is divided into eight sections, each representing a Romanian historical province: Muntenia, Dobruja, Bessarabia, Moldavia, Bukovina, Transylvania, Banat, and Oltenia. Among the cities inscribed on it are also Cahul, Chișinău, Orhei, and Tighina (now in Moldova), Cernăuți, Cetatea Albă, Ismail, and Storojineț (now in Ukraine), as well as Bazargic and Silistra (now in Bulgaria), which were part of Greater Romania before World War II.

=== Russia ===
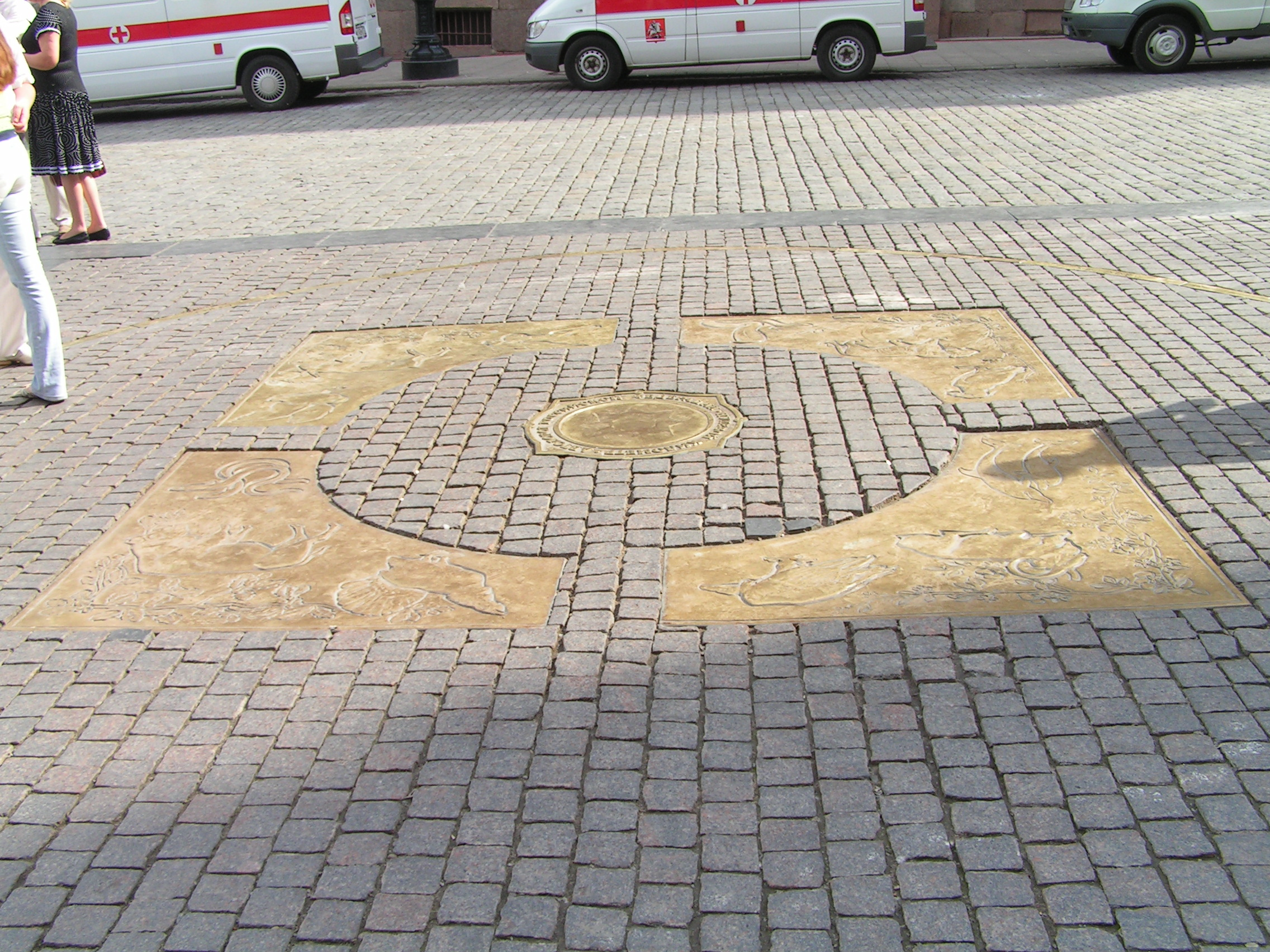
Kilometre Zero in Moscow

The bronze plaque marking Russia's kilometre zero is in Moscow, just in front of the Iberian Chapel, in a short passage connecting Red Square with Manege Square and flanked by the State Historical Museum and the State Duma.

=== Singapore ===
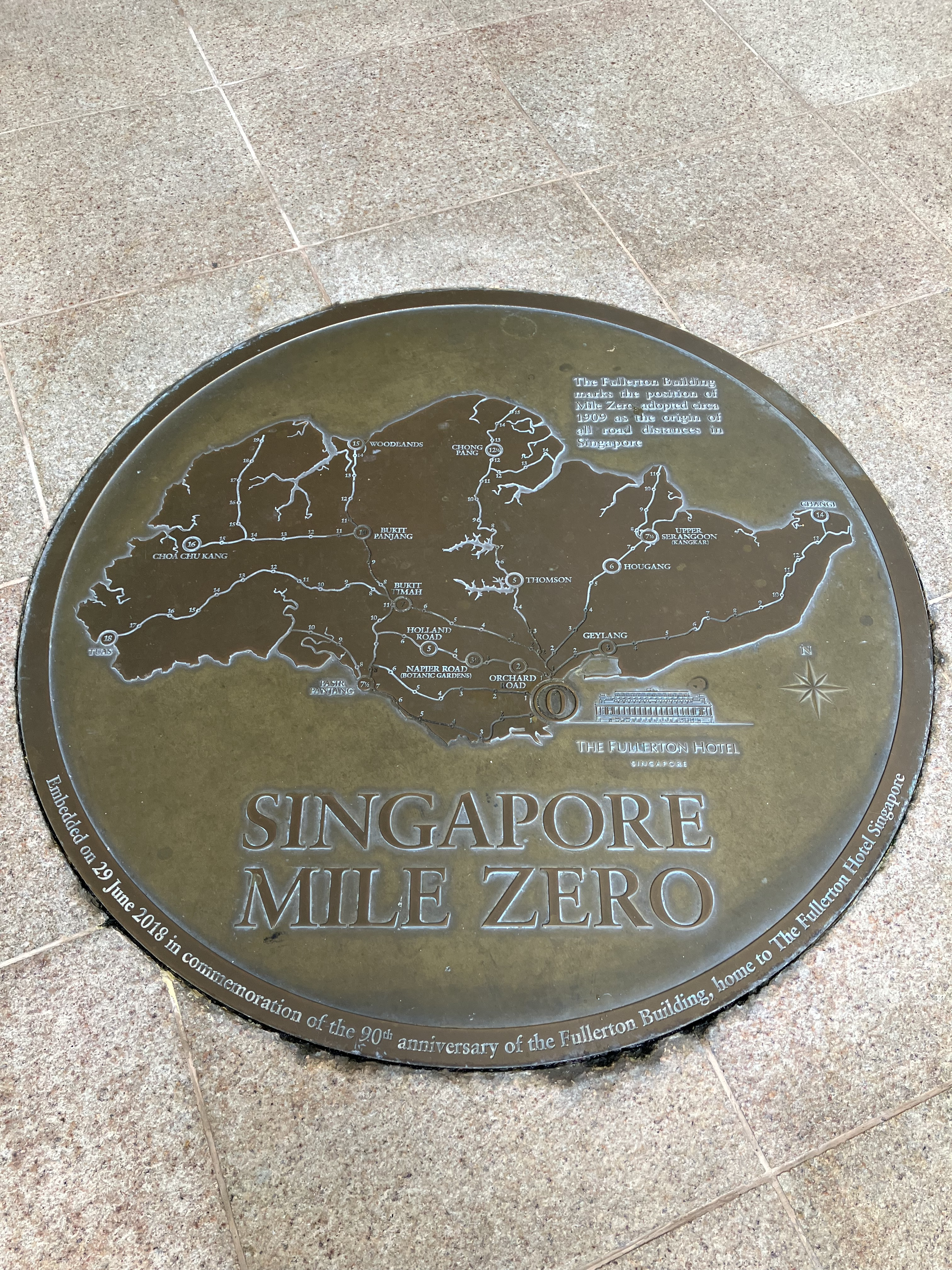
Mile Zero in Singapore

Kilometre zero in Singapore is located at the entrance of The Fullerton Hotel, known as the former General Post Office. On the basement floor of the hotel, there are several explanatory boards indicating the history of the General Post Office and Singapore's roads.

=== Slovakia ===
Slovakia has its kilometre zero in Bratislava, its capital, under Michael's Gate in the Michalská veža (St. Michael's tower).

=== South Korea ===
Seoul, the capital city of South Korea, has its doro wonpyo (Korean: 도로원표) in the centre of Gwanghwamun Intersection to measure the distances of both national and regional roads. The initial statue, erected in 1997, is near the Donghwa duty-free shop building, next to a police station, and in front of the Shinhan Bank building (Gwanghwamun Station), 151 metres (495 ft) from its exact point.

=== Spain ===
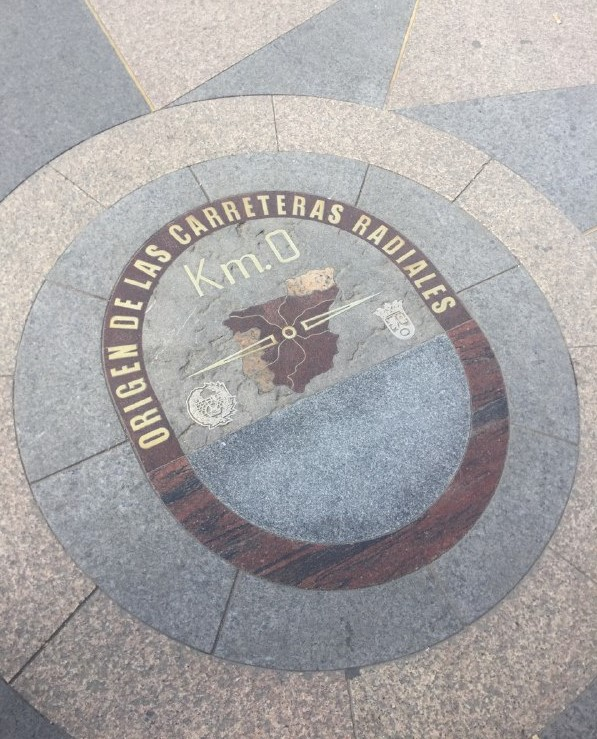
Madrid's renewed Kilometre Zero

Spain has its kilometre zero at the Puerta del Sol in Madrid, in front of the Royal House of the Post Office.

A plaque on the ground marks the official time in Spain, according to an urban legend. The plaque that marks this point was rotated 180 degrees by mistake in 2002 during a renovation of the square. This was corrected in 2009. The clock of the Post Office building marks the official time for Madrid, synchronized with Spanish ROA Time.

=== Sri Lanka ===
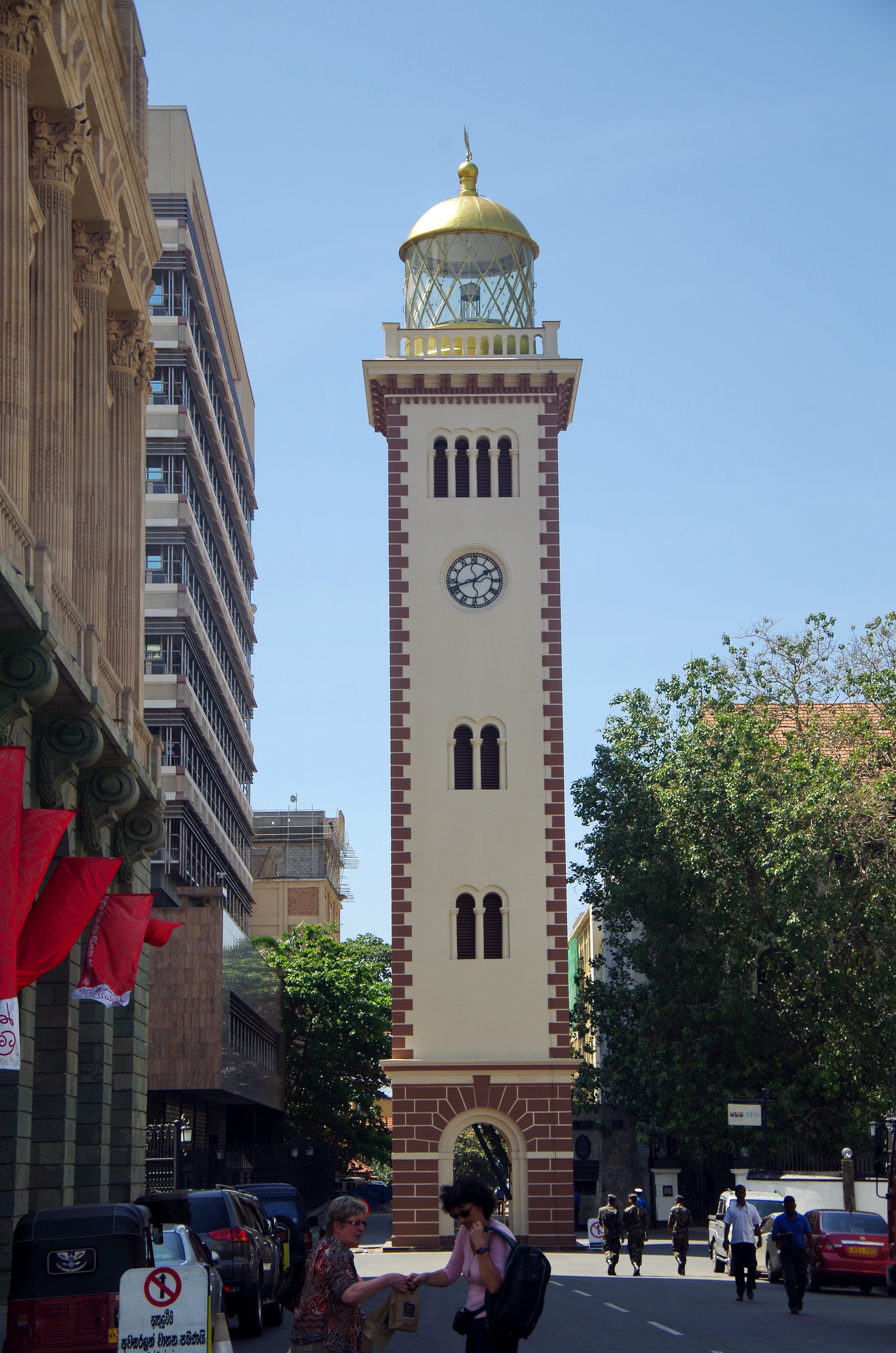
Colombo Fort Clock Tower

In Sri Lanka, all distances from its capital Colombo are measured in kilometres (formerly in miles) from the Fort Clock Tower near the President's House. This practice began with the construction of the Colombo-Kandy road in 1830, which was the first modern highway in the island. Since then, three major roads have been constructed in Colombo, i.e. A1 – Colombo-Kandy Road, A2 – Colombo-Wellawaya (CGHW) Road and A4 – Colombo-Batticaloa (CRWB) Road.

=== Sweden ===
In Sweden, the equestrian statue of King Gustav II Adolf in the middle of the Gustav Adolfs torg square in Stockholm is used as kilometre zero for modern road signs. In general road distance signs are measured to city midpoints. Historically the milestones were measured from the Stockholm Palace gates in old Swedish miles. These milestones lost their legal meaning when Sweden changed to metric units in 1889. For most mainline railways, kilometres are measured from the entrance door from the main hall to track 10 of the Stockholm Central Station. There are simple painted signs on the side of the platforms.

=== Switzerland ===
In Switzerland, the federal railway network's Kilometre Null is in Olten. It was made in the 19th century to mark the point from where the Swiss railway system was measured. Because of the complex and dense manner in which the Swiss railway system has since grown, and continues to grow, it is no longer used. There is a mark at Zürich Main Station which is a little outside the present end of the tracks and used by some mainlines.

=== Taiwan (Republic of China) ===
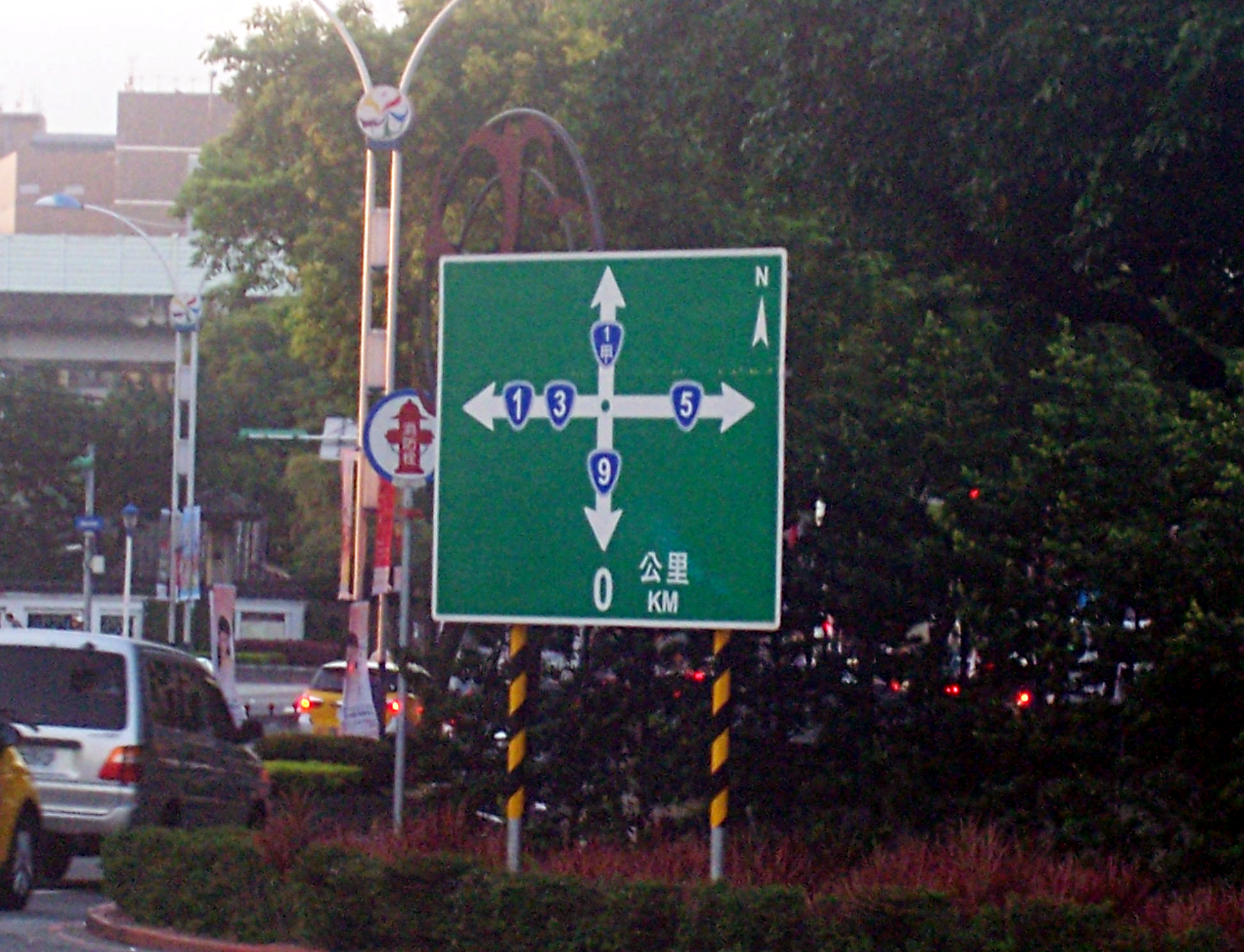
Kilometre zero in Taiwan

The crossroad of Zhongxiao Road and Zhongshan Road (Taipei) in Zhongzheng District, Taipei, Taiwan is the start point of provincial highway No. 1, 1A (Traditional Chinese: 臺1甲), 3, 5 and 9. In 2012, by the Directorate General of Highways, MOTC, a traffic sign and a sidewalk inscription marking the location as kilometre zero were placed by the northeast side and by the southeast side of the intersection separately. (Coordinates: 25.0457°N 121.5196°E)

=== Thailand ===
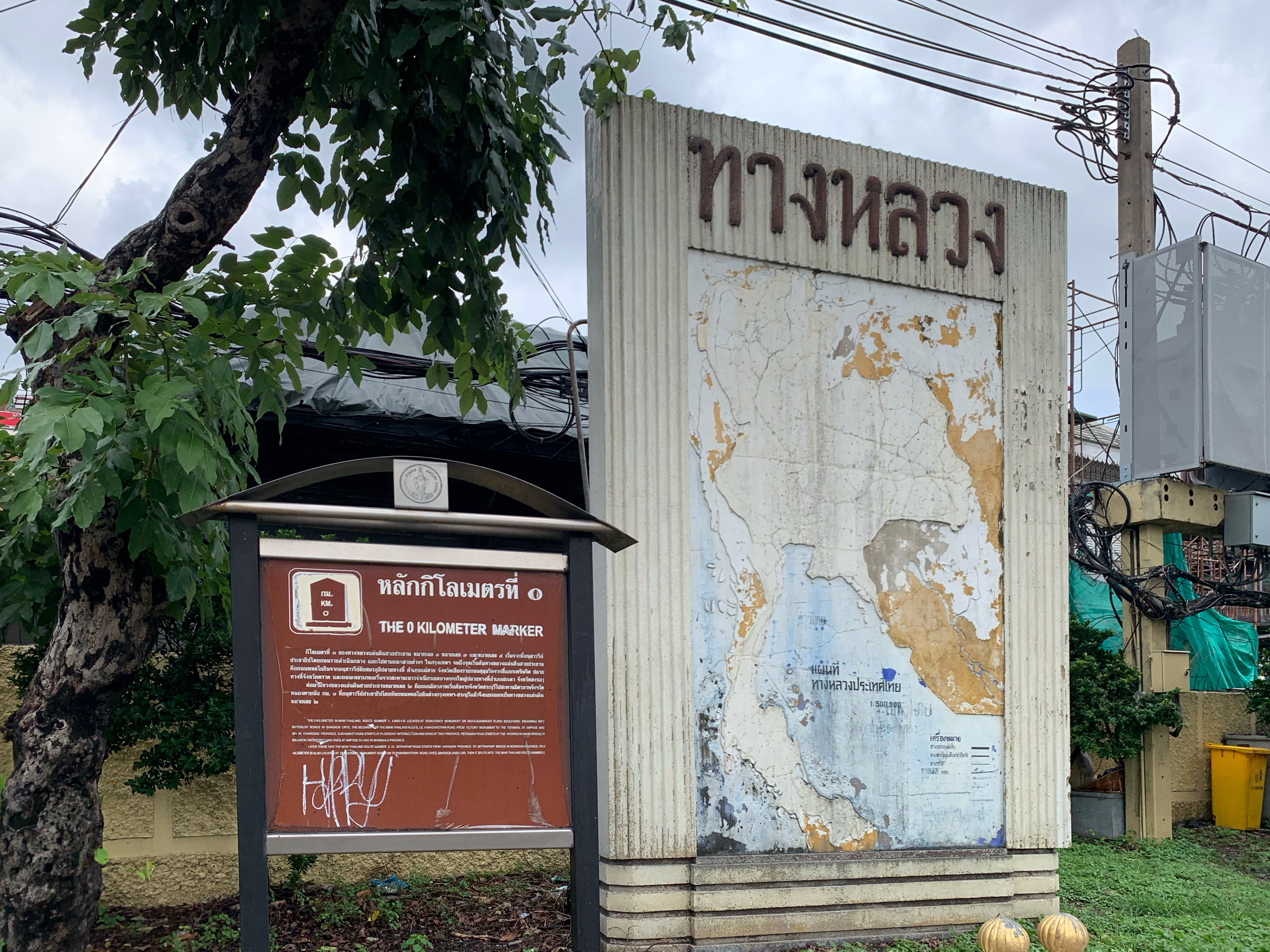
Thailand's kilometre zero marker, a map of the highway network is on it.

Thailand has two points declared as kilometre zero, both in its capital Bangkok. The National Highway's kilometre zero is near the Democracy Monument on Ratchadamnoen Avenue and the railway's kilometre zero is the Erawan Elephant Monument in front of Bangkok railway station.

=== Uganda ===
The Main Post Office building along Kampala Road in Kampala traditionally serves this purpose in Uganda and marks the Kilometre Zero for all distances from Kampala. (Coordinates: 0.313355°N 32.58117°E.)

=== Ukraine ===
Kilometre zero for Ukraine, called "The Winged Globe", is at Maidan Nezalezhnosti in Kyiv. (Coordinates: 50.4501°N 30.5234°E.)

See Media related to Globe monument (Kyiv) at Wikimedia Commons.

=== United Kingdom ===
See § Great Britain

=== United States ===
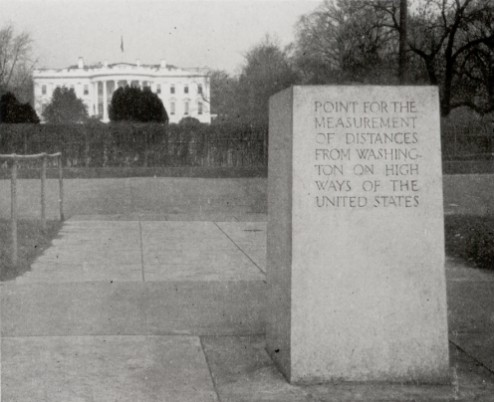
Zero Milestone in Washington, D.C.

The metric system is not the common system in the United States, but mile markers for most major roads begin at either their western or southern terminus. The mile-marking systems are generally within individual states; the mile count starts over when a state boundary is crossed.

Pierre Charles L'Enfant, the original architect of Washington, D.C., proposed an otherwise unnamed reference marker in the form of a pole that was never built, intended to be one mile (1.6 km) east of the Capitol.

Although not used for measurement on U.S. roads outside the city of Washington, D.C., a Zero Milestone near the White House was proposed in 1919 and a permanent marker placed in 1923 by the federal government, funded by the Good Roads Movement. However, the Capitol building is used as the zero point for the city including the nation.

In New York City, Columbus Circle, at the southwest corner of Central Park, is the traditional point from which all official distances are measured, although Google Maps uses New York City Hall for the purpose. Others consider Times Square as a marker.

In the City of Chicago and some of its suburbs, the intersection of State and Madison is the defined zero point.

In Los Angeles, the intersection of Main Street and 1st Street is the defined zero point. Hollywood's own zero point is at the intersection of Hollywood Boulevard and Highland Avenue.

In popular myth and some older sources, the Boston Stone is said to have been the zero marker for distances from Boston, but it was not.

Perhaps the most well-known 'Mile Zero' in the US, and the one that has spawned the creation of a popular bumper sticker, is in Key West, Florida, at the southern terminus of U.S. Route 1.

=== Uruguay ===
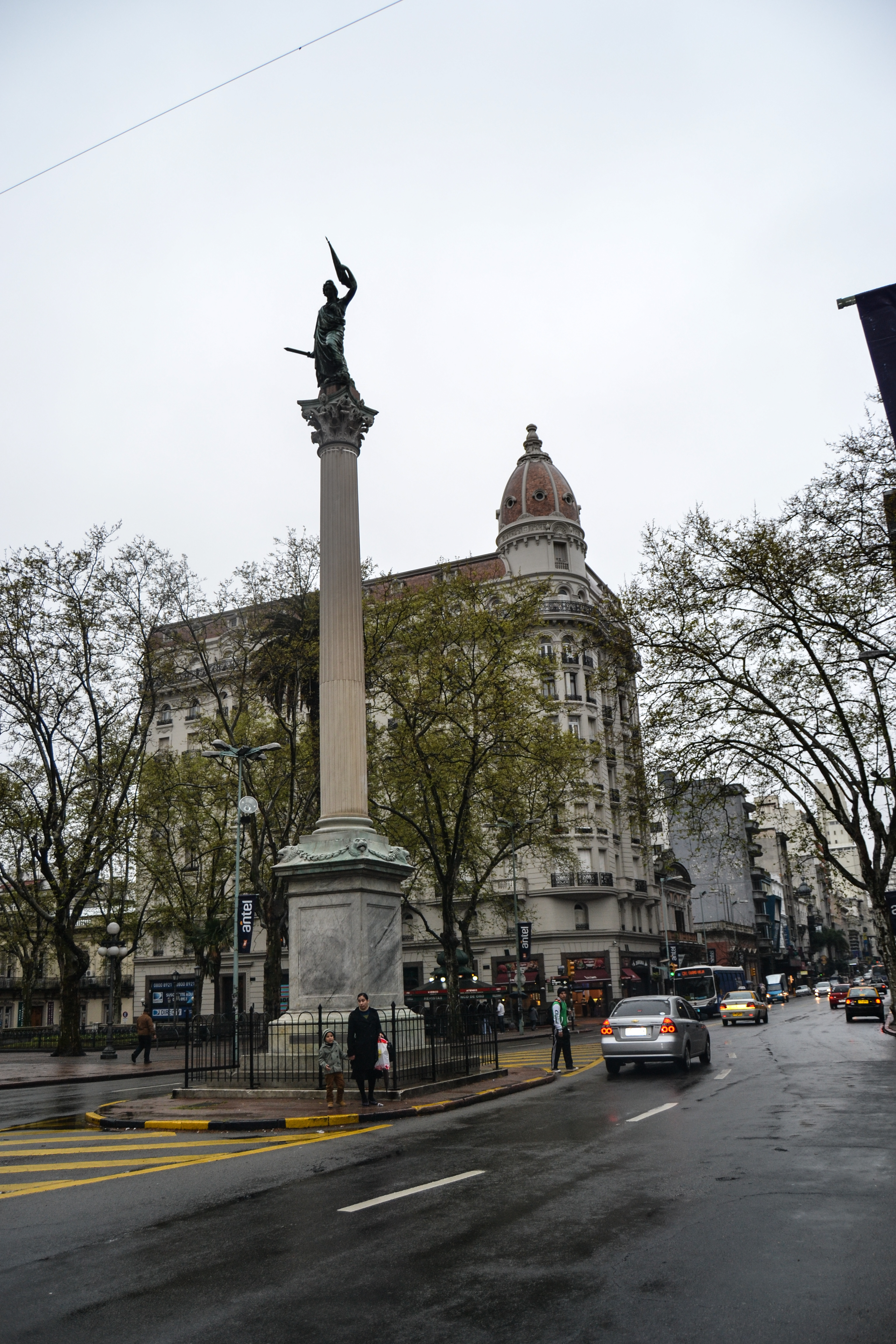
Columna de la Paz in Montevideo

Uruguay has a Kilómetro Cero for the national routes at the Monument to Peace, in Plaza de Cagancha of the city of Montevideo.

A Kilómetro Cero has been established for the Uruguay River by the Treaty of Río Uruguay in 1961 on the parallel passing the area, Punta Gorda in the Colonia Department, south of Nueva Palmira.

== Historical ==
Reconstruction of Constantinople's Milion, based on historical accounts and surviving fragments.

=== Byzantine Empire ===
The Byzantine Empire had an arched building, the Milion of Constantinople, as the starting-place for the measurement of distances for all the roads leading to the other cities. In the 1960s, some fragments were discovered and erected in its original location, now in the district of Eminönü, Istanbul, Turkey.

== See also ==
- Confluence point
- Datum (geodesy)
- Initial point
- Milestone
- Category:Geodetic datums
