= Milliarium Aureum =

Monument in Ancient Rome

- Location within Rome
- 41°53′33″N 12°29′04″E
- Type: Milestone with gilded bronze finishing
- Location: Regio VIII Forum Romanum

History
- Built: 20 BCE
- Built by: Emperor Augustus

The Milliarium Aureum (Classical Latin: [miːllɪˈaːrɪ.ũː ˈau̯rɛ.ũː]; Italian: Miliario Aureo), or the "Golden Milestone," was a monument, probably of marble or gilded bronze, erected by the Emperor Augustus near the Temple of Saturn in the central Forum of Ancient Rome. All roads were considered to begin at this monument and all distances in the Roman Empire were measured relative to it. The monument's precise location and inscription has remained a matter of debate among historians.

== History ==
According to Cassius Dio, Augustus, in his position as curator viarum, erected the monument in 20 BCE. It probably received the name Milliarium Aureum soon after its inauguration and is considered to be the starting point of the Roman road system to the rest of Italy and across the Roman world.

According to the 19th century ecclesiastical historian Philip Schaff, the phrase "all roads lead to Rome" is a reference to the Milliarium Aureum.

=== Architecture and style ===
The plan of the monument is among those missing from the recovered fragments of the Forma Urbis. The remaining fragments for this area of the Roman Forum are all in the so-called "slab V-11, Stanford University#19" (Depicting the Temple of Saturn with the frontal section and staircase, through the Rostra section is missing, the Temple of Concordia, and the Temple of the Deified Vespasian). Information from ancient authors is also very scarce, so there are many problems of interpretation concerning the exact nature of the Milliarium Aureum.

==== Structure and dimensions ====
The Milliarium Aureum seems to have been a marble column coated in gilded bronze; according to C. Hülsen, a huge marble cylinder was found in 1835 near the Temple of Saturn and it still had bronze hooks. The whole monument likely had the standard form of a Roman milestone. Some scholars think that the Milliarium Aureum was made entirely of gilded bronze, while others believe only the inscribed letters were gilded bronze. Probable dimensions for the structure include a height of 3.7 metres (12 ft), and a diameter of 1.15 metres (3.8 ft) (column only) or 3 metres (9.8 ft) if including the alleged base (i.e. the carved marble fragments labeled "Milliarium Aureum" in the Roman Forum).

=== Location ===
It is certain that it was "hard by [under] the Temple of Saturn at the head of the Roman Forum", but its exact location is still unknown. Due to archaeological data from excavations by Kähler in 1959, which seem to confirm data from excavations by Bunsen in 1833, many scholars now believe that it was located at the southeast corner of the podium of the Rostra Augusti on a symmetrical axis with the Umbilicus urbis Romae.

== Problem of the inscription ==
Ancient sources never directly say what was inscribed on the Milliarium Aureum, so every idea one may have about the inscription must be considered a modern inference based on the typical form, structure and function of Roman milestones.

The main hypotheses about the inscription suggest that it included:

- Nothing, except for the name and title of the Emperor.
- The names of the most important cities of Italy and of the Roman Empire in 20 BCE, with the distances of these from Rome. According to a vague sentence by Pliny the Elder (Naturalis Historia, 3.66), the distances in Roman miles were measured starting from the city gates and not from the location of the Milliarium (thus with a difference of ca. 1 mile): Via Appia from Porta Capena (to Brundisium, Greece and the Oriental Provinces); Via Salaria and Via Nomentana from Porta Collina and Via Flaminia (to Northern Italy, Raetia, Noricum, Pannonia and Illyricum); Via Aurelia (to the Galliae and Hispaniae); Via Ostiensis (to Ostia and the main harbours of Corsica and Sardinia, Sicilia and Africa).
- The names of the roads out of Rome and the men of praetorian rank Augustus had made curatores viarum to see to their upkeep, based on Cassius Dio's account of the erection of the monument.

=== Problem of the marble fragments labeled "Milliarium Aureum" ===
The ca. 3-m diameter marble fragments labeled "Milliarium Aureum" with an anthemion frieze decoration have long been considered part of the base of the monument. However, there is no direct evidence for this, considering as well that the diameter of this base seems to be too large for a standard milliarium.

According to Richardson, the ruins labeled "Milliarium Aureum" can be considered pertinent only if the column of the monument was of a colossal scale, of almost 3 m diameter and not 1.15 m:

Still less credible is that the carved stone members labelled Milliarium Aureum at the northwest end of the Forum Romanum today actually belonged to the base of that monument. The frieze decorated with an anthemion belongs relatively high on a building, and both elements are of a diameter equal to that of the Umbilicus Romae, too large for a milestone, unless it were of colossal scale.

== See also ==
- Kilometre zero
- Milion, an equivalent monument established in Constantinople
- Milliarium, the road marker monuments placed across the Roman road system
