= All roads lead to Rome =

Proverb

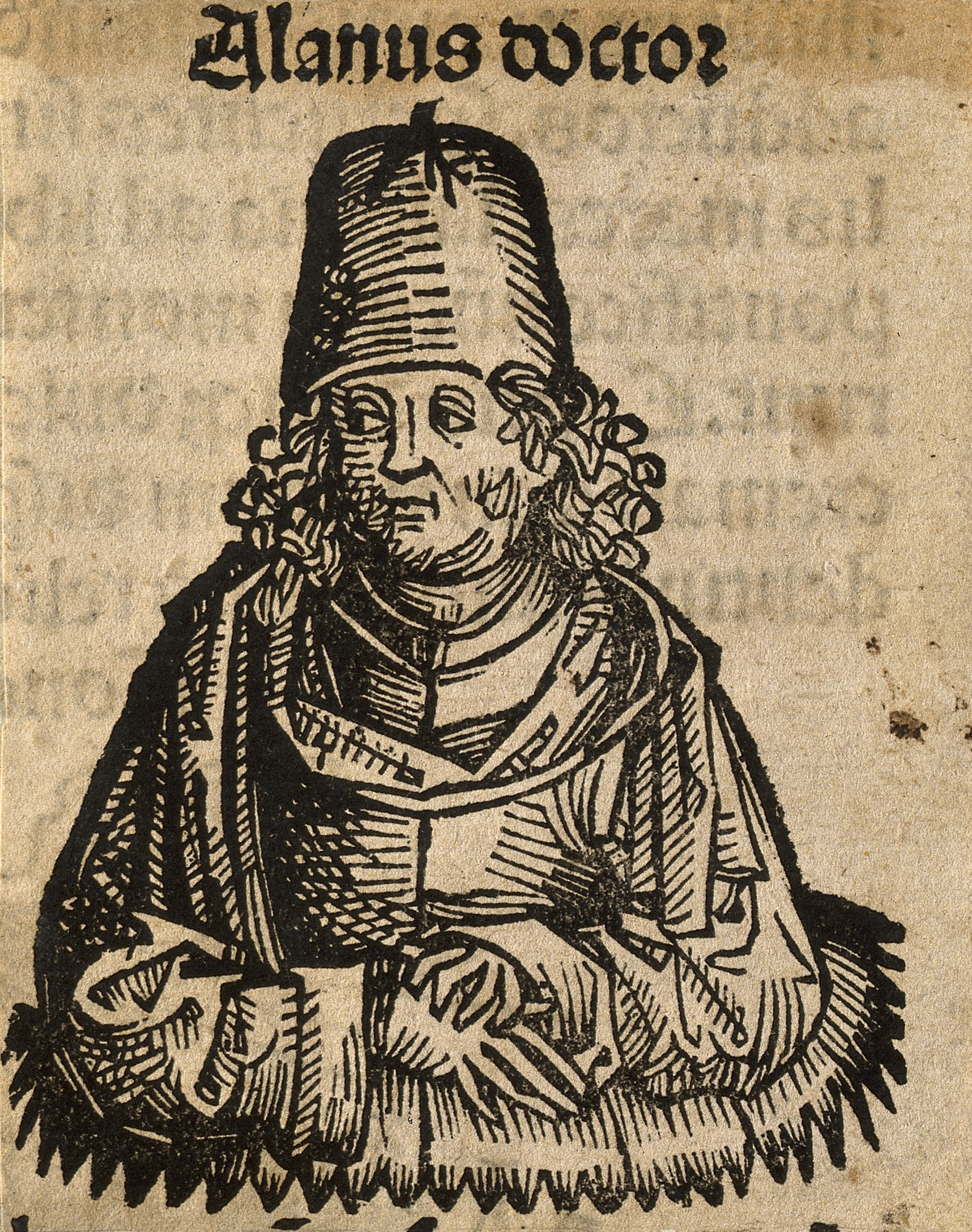
Alain de Lille; the proverb "all roads lead to Rome" originates from him.

"All roads lead to Rome" is a proverb (Note: Although it is referred to in sources as an idiom, an idiom has figurative language in its components, while the figurative meaning of a proverb elaborates on its literal meaning. The proverb references the fact that in the Roman Empire, all major roads led to Rome, so therefore by definition, all roads lead to Rome is a proverb. Although proverbs can be defined as a type of idiom, this article refers to the phrase as a proverb as it is the most common description given in the sources.) meaning that the same conclusion or outcome can and will be reached by varying and diverse decisions, choices, and paths. It is used to allude to the inevitability of a conclusion or outcome. It was first written in Medieval Latin in 1175 by Alain de Lille, and first written in English in 1391 by Geoffrey Chaucer. It references the Roman Empire's prolifically large city planning, in which essentially all of their roads most commonly led to Rome, and more importantly the Milliarium Aureum.

== Origin ==
The origin comes from the Medieval Latin proverb: "Mille viae ducunt homines per saecula Romam," the proverb translated into Modern English being: "A thousand roads lead men forever to Rome." The proverb was written in 1175 by Alain de Lille in the Liber Parabolarum (English: Book of Proverbs).

It was first written in English on A Treatise on the Astrolabe in 1391 by Geoffrey Chaucer. The proverb, written in Middle English, says that something can be as "[r]ight as diverse pathes leden diverse folk the righte way to Rome."
