= Quaestor =

Public official in ancient Rome

A quaestor (British English: /ˈkwiːstər/ KWEE-stər, American English: /ˈkwɛstər/ KWEST-ər; Latin: [ˈkʷae̯stɔr]; "investigator") was a public official in ancient Rome. There were various types of quaestors, with the title used to describe greatly different offices at different times.

In the Roman Republic, quaestors were elected officials who supervised the state treasury and conducted audits. When assigned to provincial governors, the duties were mainly administrative and logistical, but also could expand to encompass military leadership and command. It was the lowest ranking position in the cursus honorum (course of offices); by the first century BC, one had to have been quaestor to be eligible for any other posts.

In the Roman Empire, the position initially remained as assistants to the magistrates with financial duties in the provinces, but over time, it faded away in the face of the expanding imperial bureaucracy. A position with a similar name (the quaestor sacri palatii) emerged during the Constantinian period with judicial responsibilities.

== Etymology ==
Quaestor derives from the Latin verb quaero, quaerere, meaning "to inquire" (probably ultimately from the Proto-Indo-European root of interrogative pronouns *kʷo-). The job title has traditionally been understood as deriving from the original investigative function of the quaestores parricidii.

== Under the kings ==
The earliest quaestors were quaestores parricidii, chosen to investigate capital crimes, and may have been appointed as needed rather than holding a permanent position. Under the Republic, these quaestores parricidii persisted, as prosecutors for capital cases in trials before the people. They disappear, however, by the second century BC.

Ancient authors disagree on the exact manner of selection for this office as well as on its chronology, with some dating it to the mythical reign of Romulus. This view, however, is "not at all credible" and there is no clear evidence for a specific date for the quaestorship's beginning.

== During the Republic ==
The classical quaestors with financial responsibilities may be unconnected with the older questores parricidii. However, the debate still continues, but has more recently trended against connecting the two offices, which are connected by nothing other than a name. The two general theses are that the classical quaestorship related with financial matters either was created entirely separately from the older judicial quaestorship or that it evolved from that older quaestorship to meet greater administrative needs.

The traditional cursus honorum (career path) was loosely regulated, but after 197 BC, became more so, with a basic progression that one first had to hold the quaestorship before being considered for higher office as praetor or consul, with quaestor as the lowest office. After Sulla's reforms, the cursus honorum was cemented, with the added requirement that to stand for the quaestorship, one first needed to have been one of the vigintiviri and have held the military tribunate. The reforms also established that the minimum age for candidates had to be 30.

Quaestors were elected last in the electoral comitia, as they were of the lowest rank. During the late Republic, however, their terms of office started before their more senior colleagues, on 5 December rather than 1 January. This was the earliest term start of the major magistracies of the Republic, being earlier than that of the tribunes of the plebs (who came into office on 10 December).

=== Responsibilities ===
After election, they were assigned – usually by lot on their first day in office – to their tasks. Very rarely were quaestors directly assigned to a specific task without lot (i.e., extra sortem), likely with the approval of the senate to a magistrate's request. Some quaestors were assigned to specific tasks (the management of the treasury or of the grain supply in Ostia), but most were assigned to assist a higher magistrate.

Those assigned to the treasury were supervised by the Senate (usually with the consuls as intermediaries), while those assigned to a higher magistrate were supervised by their superior. Quaestors could be dismissed by their superiors, but this appears rare; there is only one known case thereof, when then-proconsul Marcus Aurelius Cotta dismissed his quaestor Publius Oppius in 73 BC.

In the early Republic, one quaestor was attached to each consul, both when the consul was in Rome for civic duties and on military campaign. By 227 BC, every magistrate with imperium (consuls and praetors) left the city accompanied by a quaestor. This close cooperation led these provincial quaestors to take a more active role in assisting their superiors with military – even assuming command at times – and administrative tasks. The expanding use of prorogation also affected quaestors, who were regularly prorogued with their superiors pro quaestore; more frustratingly, ancient sources did not always differentiate between quaestors and their proquaestorian counterparts, regularly calling both quaestors.

Quaestors in the provinces generally remained in the same province as their superiors for the duration of the superior's term, but this was not obligatory, as the quaestorian careers of Gaius Gracchus, Julius Caesar, and the rotating names of quaestors serving under Gaius Verres attest. Terms in the provinces usually lasted one or two years. Quaestors acted militarily solely under the auspices and imperium of their commanders, except under exceptional circumstances such as the death of that commander.

The relationship between a governor and his quaestor was similar to that between a patron and a client, but was entirely official. While in office together, a quaestor was expected to show "reverence, courtesy, and loyalty" to his governor; the governor was likewise obliged to respect his subordinates. This relationship often continued past the designated terms of either individual, and the quaestor could be called upon for assistance or other needs by the consul. Also related were the need to maintain a working relationship to avoid tensions that could endanger the province, as well as a "certain degree of complicity [needed...] to conceal anything that could compromise the magistrates' reputations".

==== Domestic duties ====
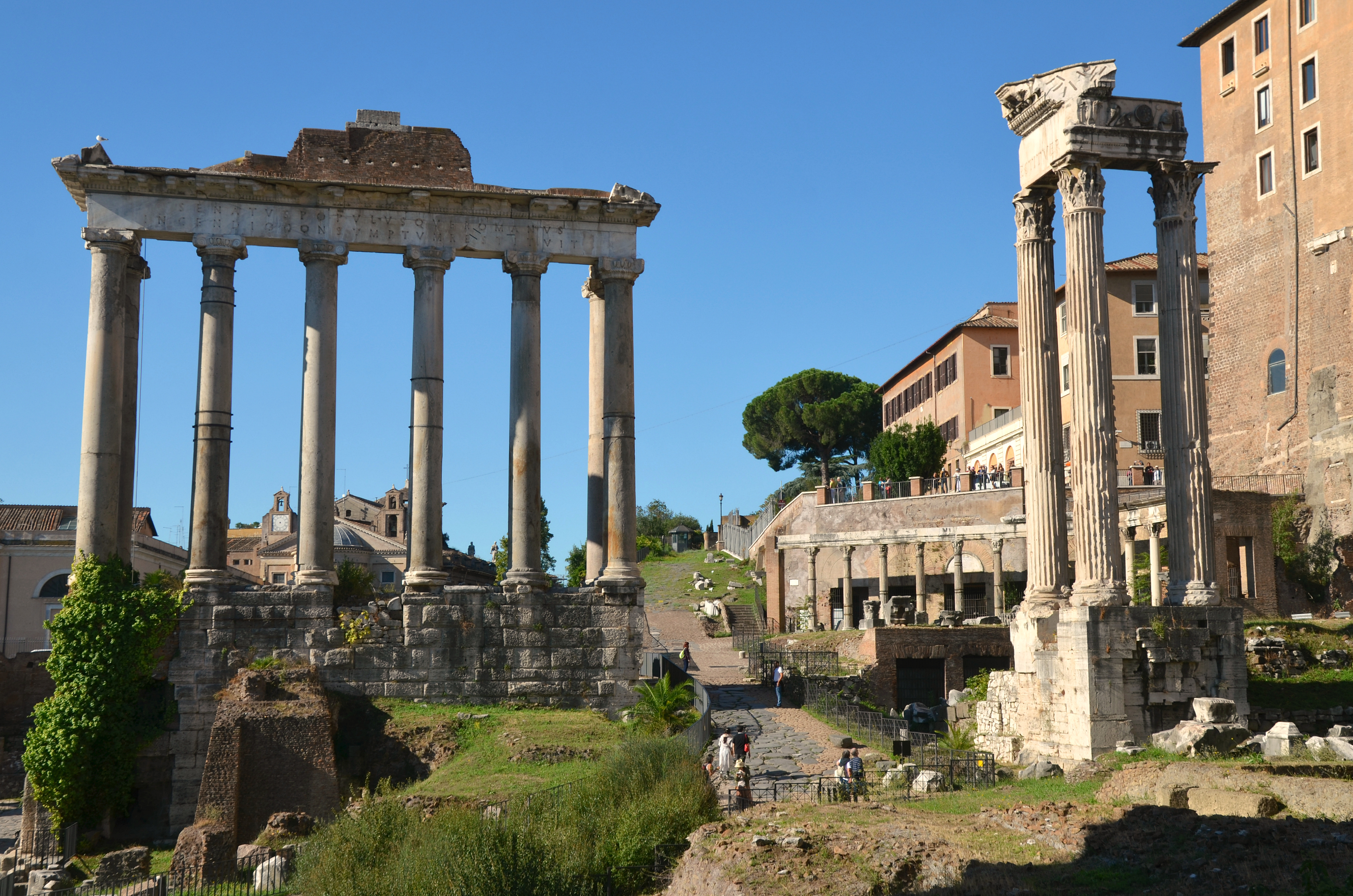
Ruins of the Temple of Saturn, the location of the aerarium, in the Forum at the foot of the Capitoline Hill in Rome.

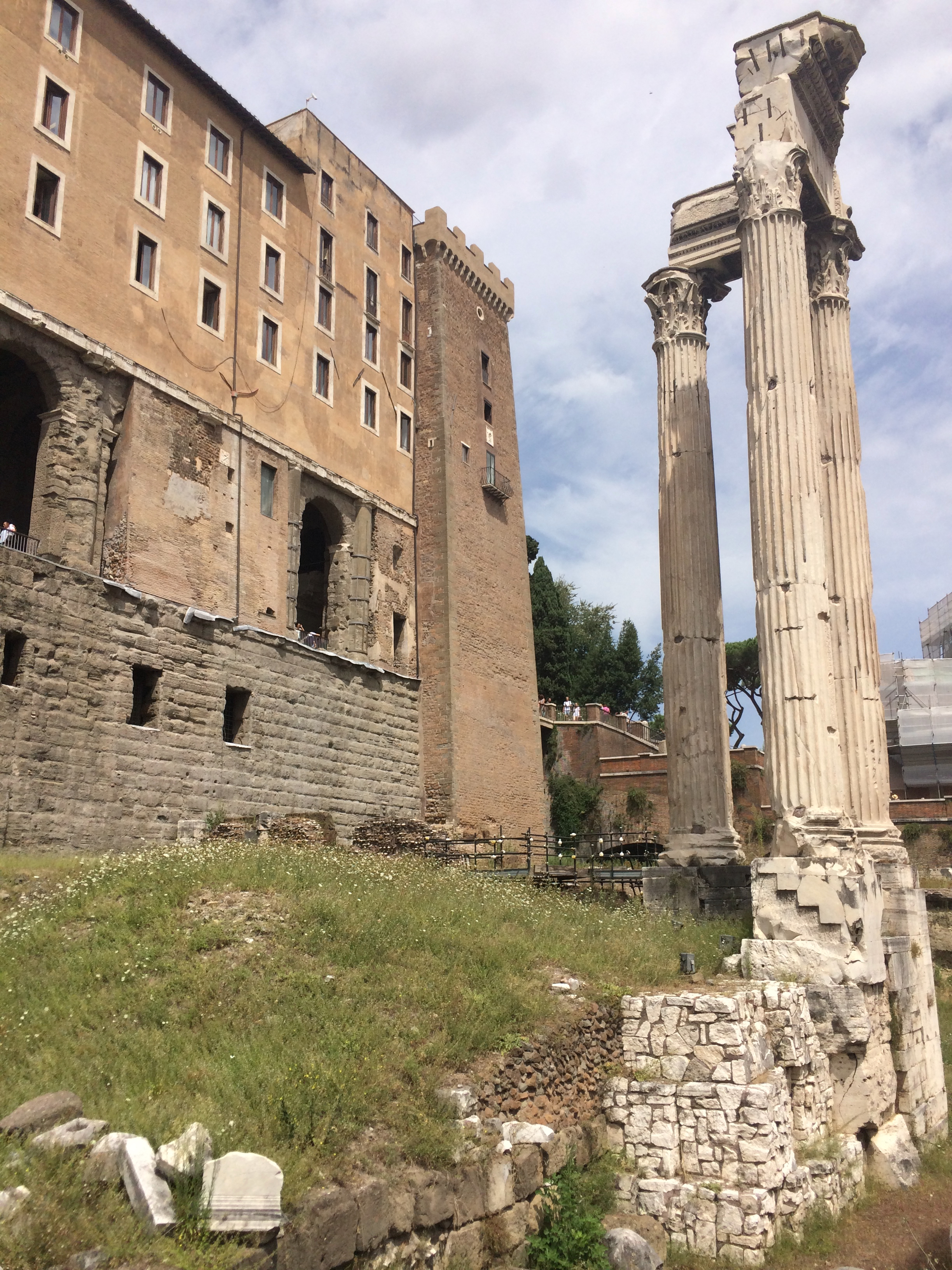
The repurposed ruins of the Tabularium (behind the fragmentary ruins of the Temple of Vespasian and Titus at right) constructed in 78 BC near the aerarium as the state record office.

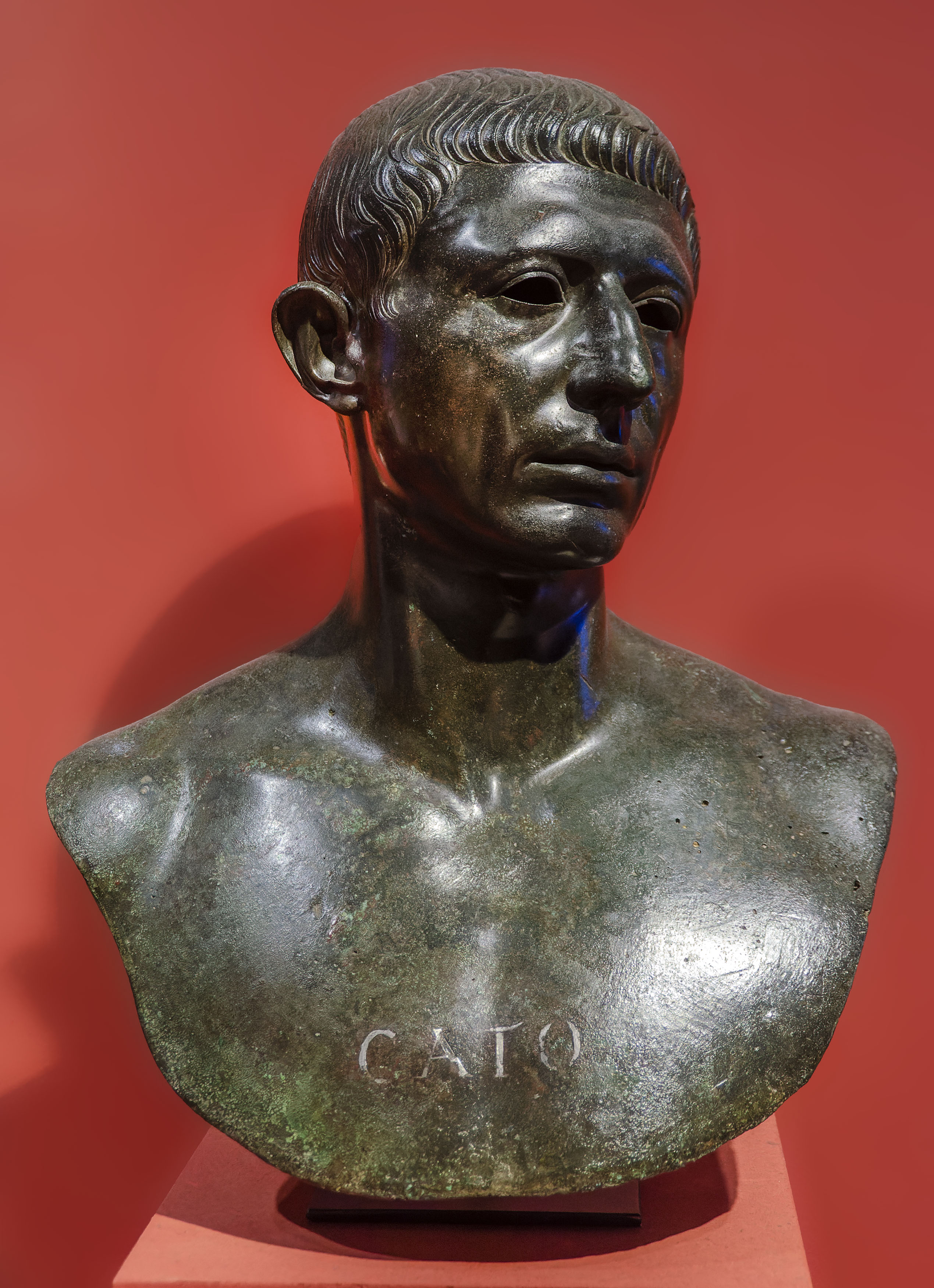
Cato the Younger served as one of the urban quaestors in 64 BC, during which he acquired a reputation for stern honesty.

There were usually two quaestors assigned to the city of Rome (termed urban quaestors), with both simultaneously responsible for the treasury. While some older scholars believed that the urban quaestors were forbidden from leaving the city, this is now rejected.

The normal main duty of the urban quaestors was to handle the aerarium (the public treasury). This involved control and management of the gold and coins stored there, safekeeping of the keys to the treasury, supervision of all public expenses and tax receipts, validation of official documents, and archival of the same. The quaestors were aided by assistants called apparitores, who likely served multi-year terms to familiarise themselves with the job; their number multiplied during the later Republic to meet administrative needs. As part of administering the treasury, they also handled the receipt and auditing of war reparations and tribute from polities defeated by Rome. Collections of taxes were also handled by the urban quaestors and their staff, with overpayments reimbursed when funds became available. They also made the appropriate withdrawals from the treasury to cover various expenses – including building, army pay, temple maintenance, state visits, state funerals, road maintenance, minting of coins, etc – as directed by the Senate.

They were also in charge of auctions for public land (ager publicus). Such land was acquired by conquest and became the property of the Roman people. Land sales could be directed by the Senate to meet funding shortfalls, as during the Second Punic War, when the urban quaestors auctioned lands around Capua to raise funds. These quaestors were also responsible for handling public auction of war booty returned to the public treasury by victorious generals. This included objects as well as slaves, with the proceeds to be deposited in the public treasury. They were also responsible for public auction of property seized from citizens who had debts or fines owed to the state if they were unable to pay. These responsibilities over public debts also included the collection of fines in general, where a convict ordered to pay a fine would be required to make a surety to the urban quaestors and deposit the money in the aerarium.

Returning magistrates and governors also had to produce detailed account books for their handling of public money, which would then be deposited in the treasury, where the urban quaestors and their staff would audit them. These records were supposed to total a running ledger of starting balances, a line-by-line itemised accounting of all inflows and outflows, and ending balances for the province. They also included, for generals, detailed lists of all the money, gold, silver, spoils, and other assets acquired during a governorship. The scribes checked the account books, looking for transactional documentation and arithmetic errors, the results were then approved or disapproved by the quaestors. A negative audit could provide fodder for corruption charges, which was regular in the last two centuries of the Republic.

After the formation of the permanent courts (quaestiones perpetuae), the urban quaestors were also responsible for assembling the jury pools and allocation of portions of those pools to the various courts. These quaestors also handled various tasks assigned ad hoc by the Senate, such as meeting and accompanying foreign dignitaries on state visits or leaving Rome to the provinces on special assignments.

In the earlier Republic, the quaestors also controlled the distribution of the legionary aquilae (eagle standards), which were kept in the treasury before distribution to generals before they were returned on the conclusion of a campaign. This likely, however, fell into disuse as Rome expanded across the Mediterranean.

==== Provincial administration ====
The extent of the Roman Republic and its provinces on the eve of Caesar's assassination in 44 BC.

Because consuls, praetors, and their promagisterial counterparts were "practically... plenipotentiary agent[s] upon [which all] aspect[s] of government associated with that provincia depended", the quaestor's responsibilities could vary widely, including not only financial and administrative matters but also sometimes encompassing military command and judicial functions. In general, however, the core administrative duty of the quaestor was to "[extract] whatever material assets the Roman military apparatus might need". When quaestors were sometimes assigned to a province alone (without attachment to a superior) in the late republic, quaestorian responsibilities increased dramatically as the only Roman magistrate present. At times, quaestors were sent without superiors to peaceful acquisitions to inventory property, auction them if necessary, and transport proceeds to Rome.

During normal times under a governor, the quaestor would handle administrative tasks related to supply of the armies. He would oversee the transport of public money assigned by the Senate to the province, record its uses, and use it to pay soldiers' wages or purchase supplies. He also helped manage the taxation of the province in terms of collecting food, supplies, and money from local leaders. In terms of taxation, quaestors also handled the local auction of raw goods to public contractors (publicani) or merchants; at times, they also made requisitions from local provincials on orders of their superior or at times on their own accord. This remit also extended to minting coinage – usually to pay soldiers serving in the provinces – from precious metal stocks on hand.

The provincial quaestor also had to carefully record all the money that fell into the provincial government's hands. Other assets acquired by conquest or otherwise classed as war spoils – from gold to grain, arms, and ships – also had to be inventoried, recorded, and deposited in the public treasury at Rome. Captives captured in war were usually sold into slavery in that province, which was managed by the quaestor for funds also to be noted in the account books. They also were expected to register those provincial records in Rome upon conclusion of their terms for review by the urban quaestors, which were supposed to record all movements of funds. Loss of those records could give rise to damaging charges of corruption. After Julius Caesar's lex Julia, these records had to be made in triplicate, with two copies lodged in provincial cities (not always the same cities from governor to governor) and the remaining copy returned to Rome for presentation. Then, at least according to custom, both the quaestor and the governor would return to Rome to present the provincial accounts. Upon the close of the term, the quaestor would coordinate to divide the remaining money between the incoming provincial administration and the treasury in Rome.

These great responsibilities with little immediate oversight gave both provincial quaestors and their governors many opportunities for corruption by misappropriating funds, demanding exorbitant taxes, getting involved in various business schemes, or taking bribes outright. Quaestors' behaviour did not always comport with their administrative and legal responsibilities.

==== On campaign ====
On campaign, provincial quaestors acted as subordinate military officers to their attached superior, taking a role "analogous to... that [of] other members of the governor's entourage, such as his legates". At times, the quaestor could get into tension with the governor's legates over respective spheres of responsibility or accountability; officially, however, the quaestor was "higher up the chain of command... [as], besides the governor, he was the only magistrate [and] representative of the Senate and the Roman people", giving him "greater authority than legates in all areas of provincial command".

Quaestors are documented at various times leading and raising troops and fleets under the command of their governors. Some quaestors were delegated significant open-ended responsibilities far exceeding administrative tasks: Lucullus, for example, during the First Mithridatic War as Sulla's proquaestor, led troops, assembled fleets, travelled the eastern Mediterranean as a diplomat, intervened to overthrow governments, commanded naval battles, captured prisoners, and levied taxes and indemnities.

When a governor left the province, he normally left it to his quaestor's command (though this was at times given instead to one of his high-ranking legates). If a governor died, however, the quaestor generally assumed command of the forces until replacement, possibly with imperium pro praetore. The specifics of how this imperium was delegated after the death of its actual possessor are unclear: some scholars believe that this was automatic, whereas others believed that a proconsul had to first endow his quaestor with propraetorian imperium.

A provincial quaestor also could be sent as a diplomatic representative. Two famous examples thereof are those of Tiberius Gracchus and Sulla: Gracchus negotiated a peace treaty on behalf of his proconsul allowing some twenty thousand soldiers to leave with their lives (though the treaty was later invalidated by the Senate) and Sulla negotiated the capture of Jugurtha at the end of the Jugurthine War.

=== History ===
There were initially two quaestors; they were initially appointed by the consuls, but according to Tacitus after 447 BC, they were elected by the comitia tributa. When plebeians were permitted to stand for the quaestorship in 421 BC, two more were added, with assignments to administer the aerarium under senatorial direction. It is also around this time that Livy reports a relationship between the quaestors and the public treasury. After 267 BC, four more quaestors were added, possibly with assignments to various towns in Italy (e.g., Ostia for management of the food supply).

The specific number elected year-to-year is difficult to determine at any time, but before Lucius Cornelius Sulla's reforms in 81 BC, there were 19 quaestors; his reforms created one for the water supply, raising the total to 20. He also made holding the quaestorship compulsory for advancement to future offices. These reforms also established a minimum age for the office, established at 30. Additionally, the reforms granted quaestors automatic membership in the senate upon being elected, whereas previously, membership in the senate was granted only after censors revised the Senate rolls every few years.

During Julius Caesar's dictatorship, he doubled the number of quaestors to forty.

== During the empire ==
=== Principate ===
During the Principate, the number was halved back to twenty by Augustus. He also removed the quaestors from government of the aerarium (with a short interlude under Claudius when this was reversed). The emperor and the two consuls each had two quaestors, with the emperor selecting his own, the quaestores Caesaris, who were often up-and-coming men from noble families.

Over time, the former duties of the quaestors were subsumed by imperial officials, but, in the senatorial provinces, they "retained some financial functions through the Principate".

=== Late empire ===
During the reign of the Emperor Constantine I, a new quaestorship was established, called the quaestor sacri palatii (lit. 'the quaestor of the sacred palace'). The office functioned as a spokesman for the emperor and was charged with the creation of laws and management of legal petitions, serving as de facto minister of justice. The formal judicial powers of the office were slim, but, as chief legal advisor to the emperor, holders gained substantial influence. Various famous lawyers held this quaestorship, including Antiochus Chuzon and Tribonian, who contributed greatly to the production of the Theodosian Code and Code of Justinian, respectively.

From 440 onward, the office of the quaestor worked in conjunction with the praetorian prefect of the East to oversee the supreme tribunal, or supreme court, at Constantinople. There, they heard appeals from the various subordinate courts and governors.

=== Byzantine empire ===
Emperor Justinian I also created the offices quaesitor, a judicial and police official for Constantinople, and quaestor exercitus (quaestor of the army), a short-lived joint military-administrative post covering the border of the lower Danube. The quaestor sacri palatii survived long into the Byzantine Empire, although its duties were altered to match the quaesitor by the 9th century AD, who was a judicial officer in charge of resolving various disputes.

The office survived into the 14th century as a purely honorific title.

== See also ==
- Constitution of the Roman Republic
- Roman magistrate
- List of Roman quaestors
