= Aedes Tensarum =

Coordinates: 41°53′36″N 12°28′59″E

Aedes Tensarum (also referred to as Aedes Thensarum, Thensarium or Tensarium Vetus) was a small temple located in area Capitolina on the Capitoline Hill of ancient Rome that is only attested in a military diploma.

This small temple was used as a storehouse where the chariots that carried the exuviae (sacred representations) of divinities were kept.
