= Capitoline Hill =

One of the seven hills of Rome, Italy

Coordinates: 41°53′36″N 12°28′59″E

- One of the seven hills of Rome
- Latin name: Collis Capitolinus
- Italian name: Campidoglio
- Rione: Campitelli
- Buildings: Piazza del Campidoglio, Palazzo Senatorio, Palazzo dei Conservatori, Palazzo Nuovo, Tabularium, Aedes Tensarum
- Churches: Santa Maria in Aracoeli
- Ancient Roman religion: Temple of Jupiter, Temple of Veiovis, Ludi Capitolini, Aedes Tensarum
- Roman sculptures: Colossus of Constantine

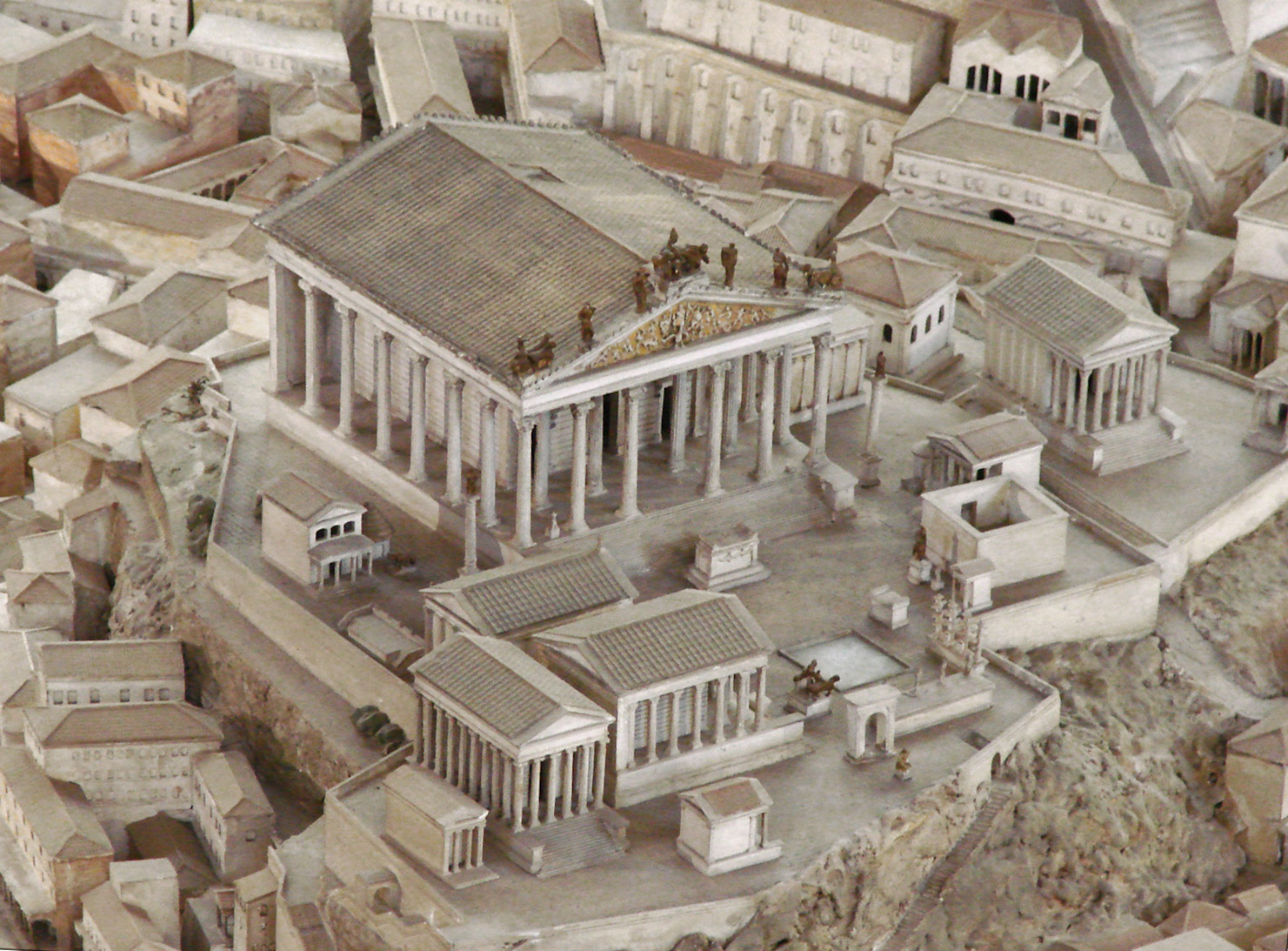
Gismondi's scale model of the Capitoline Hill under Constantine, Museum of Roman Civilization

A schematic map of Rome showing the Seven Hills and the Servian Wall

The Capitolium or Capitoline Hill (/ˈkæpɪtəlaɪn, kəˈpɪt-/ KAP-it-ə-lyne, kə-PIT-; Italian: Campidoglio [kampiˈdɔʎʎo]; Latin: Mons Capitolinus [ˈmõːs kapɪtoːˈliːnʊs]), between the Forum and the Campus Martius, is one of the Seven Hills of Rome.

The hill was earlier known as Mons Saturnius, dedicated to the god Saturn. The word Capitolium first referred to the Temple of Jupiter Optimus Maximus which was located on the hill; however, the meaning evolved to refer to the whole hill and even other temples of Jupiter on other hills. In an etymological myth, ancient sources connect the name to caput ("head", "summit") because of a tale that stated that when the foundations for the temple were being laid, a man's head was found. The Capitolium was regarded by the Romans as indestructible, and was adopted as a symbol of eternity.

The word Capitolium is a precursor to the English word capitol, and Capitol Hill in Washington, D.C. is widely assumed to be named after the Capitoline Hill.

== Ancient history ==
At this hill, the Sabines, creeping to the Citadel, were let in by the Roman maiden Tarpeia. For this treachery, Tarpeia was the first to be punished by being flung from a steep cliff overlooking the Roman Forum. This cliff was later named the Tarpeian Rock after the Vestal Virgin, and became a frequent execution site. The Sabines, who immigrated to Rome following the Rape of the Sabine Women, settled on the Capitoline.

The Vulcanal (Shrine of Vulcan), an 8th-century BC sacred precinct, occupied much of the eastern lower slopes of the Capitoline, at the head of what later became the Roman Forum. The summit was the site of a temple for the Capitoline Triad, started by Rome's fifth king, Tarquinius Priscus (r. 616–579 BC), and completed by the seventh and last king, Tarquinius Superbus (535–496 BC). It was considered one of the largest and the most beautiful temples in the city, although little now remains. The city legend starts with the recovery of a human skull (the word for head in Latin is caput) when foundation trenches were being dug for the Temple of Jupiter at Tarquin's order. Recent excavations on the Capitoline uncovered an early cemetery under the Temple of Jupiter.

Capitoline Hill plan
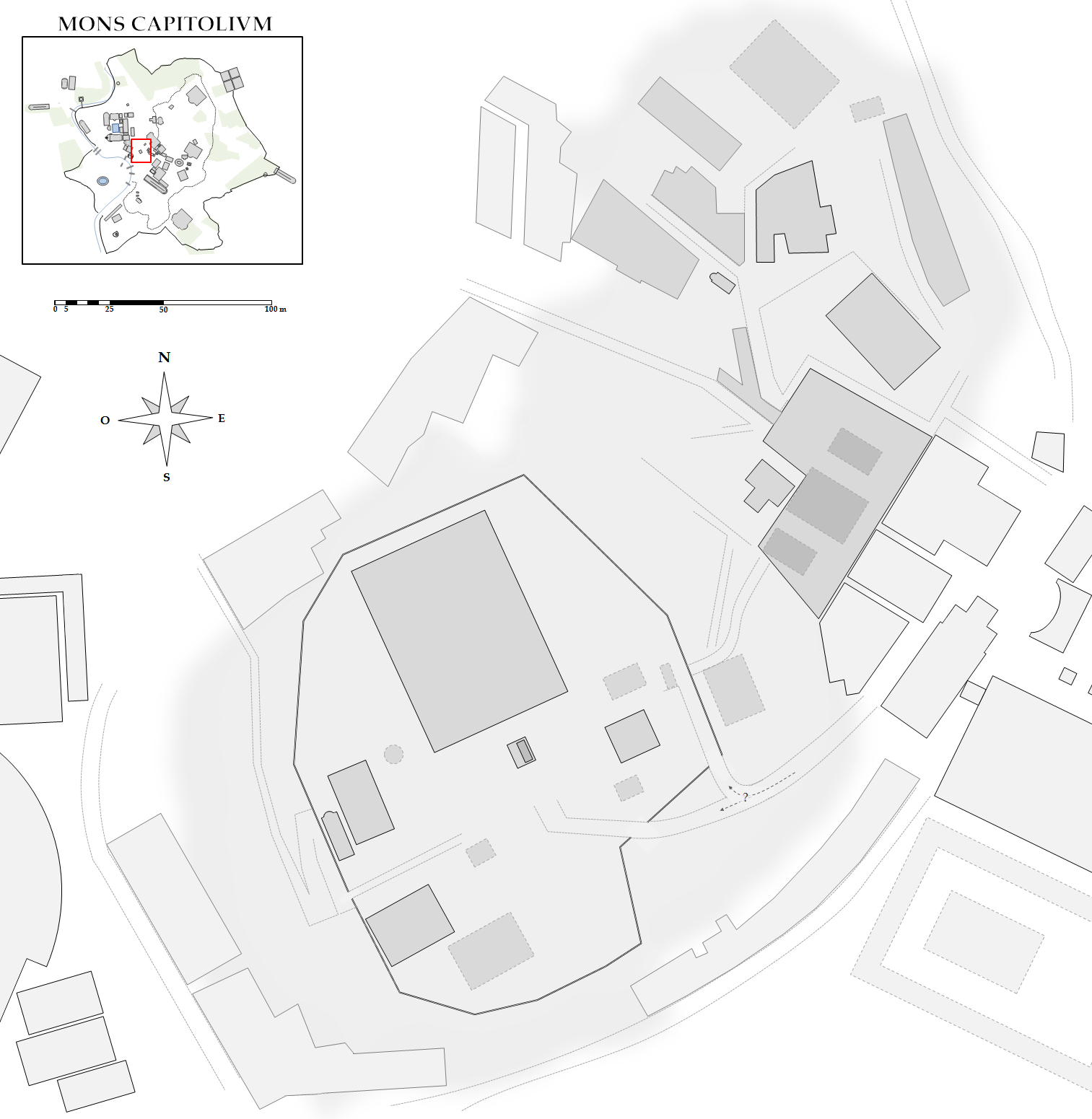

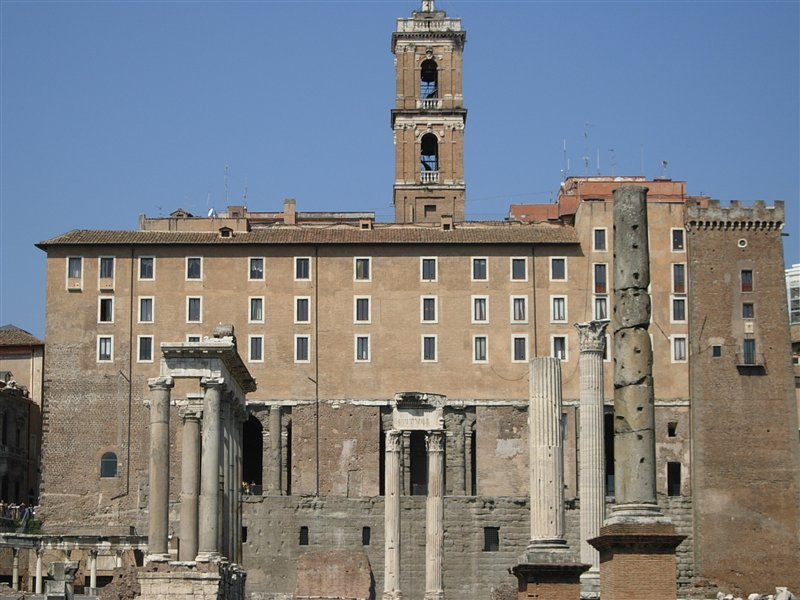
The Tabularium, behind the corner columns of the Temple of Vespasian and Titus

There are several important temples built on Capitoline Hill: the temple of Juno Moneta, the temple of Virtus, and the Temple of Jupiter Optimus Maximus Capitolinus. The Temple of Jupiter Optimus Maximus Capitolinus is the most important of the temples. It was built in 509 BC and was nearly as large as the Parthenon. The hill and the temple of Jupiter became the symbols of Rome, the capital of the world. The Temple of Saturn was built at the foot of Capitoline Hill in the western end of the Forum Romanum.

When the Senones Gauls, who settled in central-east Italy, raided Rome in 390 BC, after the battle of River Allia, the Capitoline Hill was the one section of Rome to evade capture by the barbarians, due to its being fortified by the Roman defenders. According to legend, Marcus Manlius Capitolinus was alerted to the Gallic attack by the sacred Roman geese of Juno.

When Julius Caesar suffered an accident during his triumph, clearly indicating the wrath of Jupiter for his actions in the Civil Wars, he approached the hill and Jupiter's temple on his knees as a way of averting the unlucky omen. Nevertheless, he was murdered six months later, and Brutus and his other assassins locked themselves inside the temple afterward. Vespasian's brother and nephew were besieged in the temple during the Year of Four Emperors (69). During this incident the temple was destroyed by fire.

The Tabularium, located underground beneath the piazza and hilltop, occupies a building of the same name built in the 1st century BC to hold Roman records of state. The Tabularium looks out from the rear onto the Roman Forum. The main attraction of the Tabularium, besides the structure itself, is the Temple of Veiovis. During the lengthy period of ancient Rome, the Capitoline Hill was the geographical and ceremonial center. However, by the Renaissance era, the former center was an untidy conglomeration of dilapidated buildings and the site of executions of criminals.

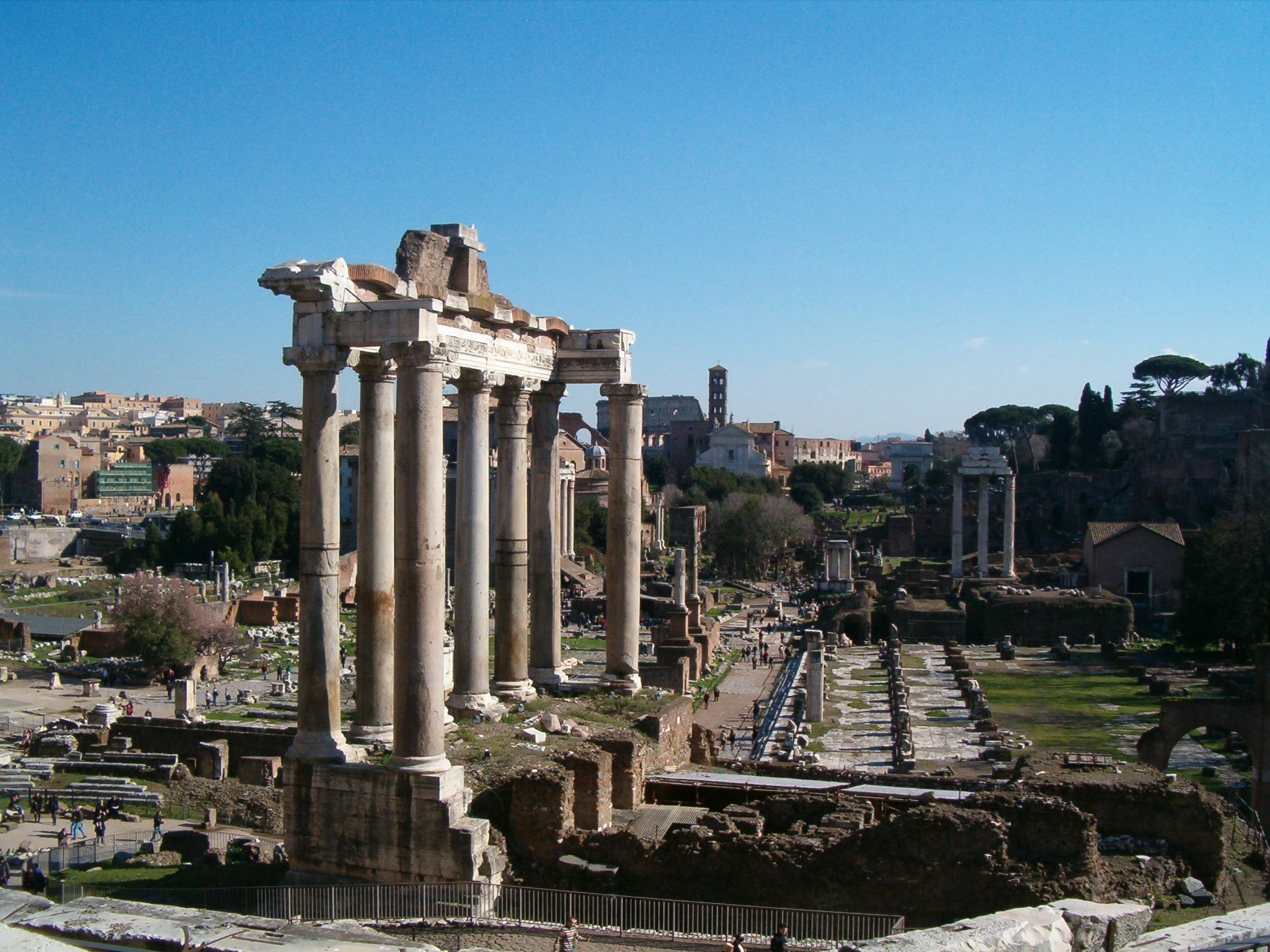
The Temple of Saturn in the Roman Forum

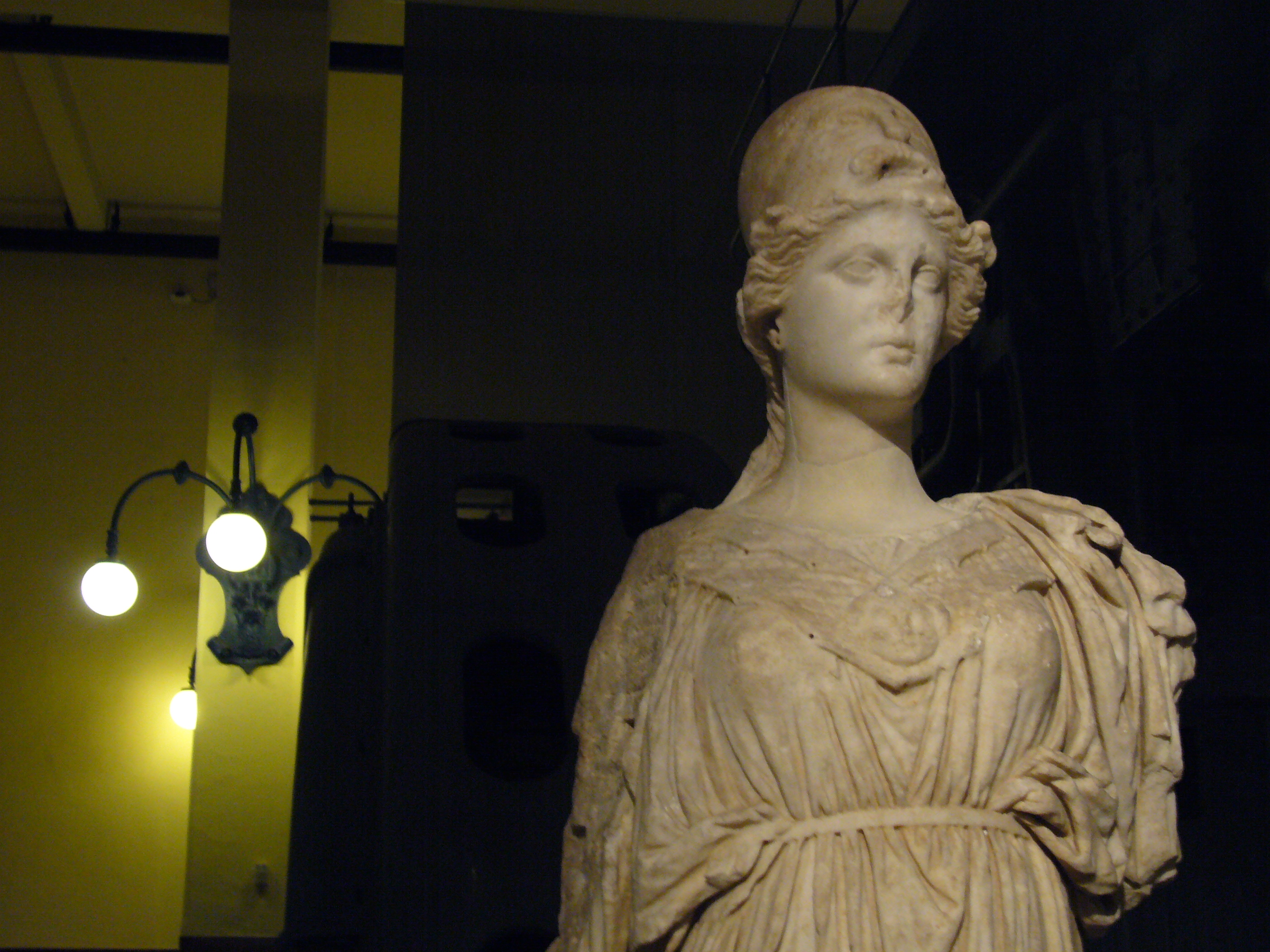
A statue of the Minerva/Athena of the Capital at the Centrale Montemartini Museum, Rome

== Medieval history ==
The church of Santa Maria in Aracoeli is adjacent to the square, located near where the ancient arx, or citadel, atop the hill it once stood. At its base are the remains of a Roman insula, with more than four storeys visible from the street.

In the Middle Ages, the hill's sacred function was obscured by its other role as the center of the civic government of Rome, revived as a commune in the 12th century. Rome's government was now firmly under papal control, but the Capitoline was the scene of movements of urban resistance, such as the dramatic scenes of Cola di Rienzo's revived republic.

In 1144, a revolt by the citizens against the authority of the Pope and nobles led to a senator taking up his official residence on the Capitoline Hill. The senator's new palazzo turned its back on the ancient forum, beginning the change in orientation on the hill that Michelangelo later accentuated. A small piazza was laid out in front of the senator's palazzo, intended for communal purposes. In the middle of the 14th century, the guilds' court of justice was constructed on the southern end of the piazza. This later housed the Conservatori in the 15th century. As a result, the piazza was already surrounded by buildings by the 16th century.

== Michelangelo ==
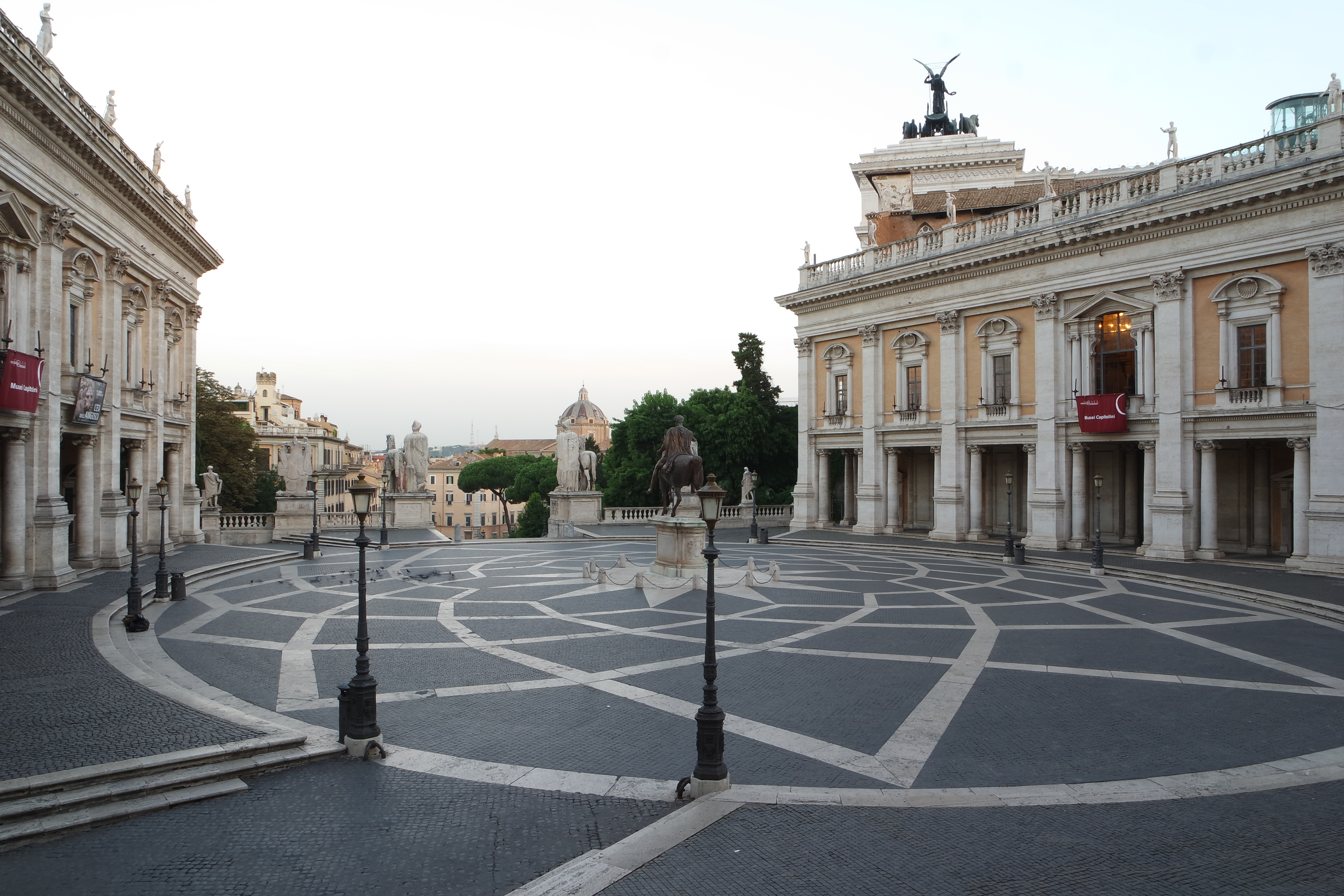
Piazza del Campidoglio, on the top of Capitoline Hill, with the façades of Palazzo dei Conservatori (left) and Palazzo Nuovo

The existing design of the Piazza del Campidoglio and the surrounding palazzi was created by Renaissance artist and architect Michelangelo Buonarroti in 1536–1546. At the height of his fame, he was commissioned by the Farnese Pope Paul III, who wanted a symbol of the new Rome to impress Charles V, who was expected in 1538. This offered him the opportunity to build a monumental civic plaza for a major city as well as to reestablish the grandeur of Rome.

Michelangelo's first designs for the piazza and remodeling of the surrounding palazzi date from 1536. His plan was formidably extensive. He accentuated the reversal of the classical orientation of the Capitoline, in a symbolic gesture turning Rome's civic center to face away from the Roman Forum and instead in the direction of Papal Rome and the Christian church in the form of St. Peter's Basilica. This full half circle turn can also be seen as Michelangelo's desire to address the new, developing section of the city rather than the ancient ruins of the past.

An equestrian statue of Marcus Aurelius was to stand in the middle of the piazza set in a paved oval field. Michelangelo was commissioned to provide a setting for the statue and to bring order to an irregular hilltop already encumbered by two crumbling medieval buildings set at an acute angle to one another. The Palazzo del Senatore was to be restored with a double outer stairway, and the campanile moved to the center axis of the palazzo.

The Palazzo dei Conservatori was to be restored, and a new building, the so-called Palazzo Nuovo, built at the same angle on the north side of the piazza to offset the Conservatori, creating a trapezoidal piazza. A wall and balustrade were to be built at the front of the square, giving it a firm delineation on the side facing the city. A flight of steps was to lead up to the enclosed piazza from below, further accentuating the central axis.

The sequence, cordonata, piazza, and the central palazzo are the first urban introduction of the "cult of the axis" that was to occupy Italian garden plans and reach fruition in France.

Executing the design was slow: Little was actually completed in Michelangelo's lifetime. The Cordonata Capitolina was not in place when Emperor Charles arrived, and the imperial party had to scramble up the slope from the Forum to view the works in progress. Work continued faithfully to his designs and the Campidoglio was completed in the 17th century, except for the paving design, which was finished three centuries later.

=== Piazza ===
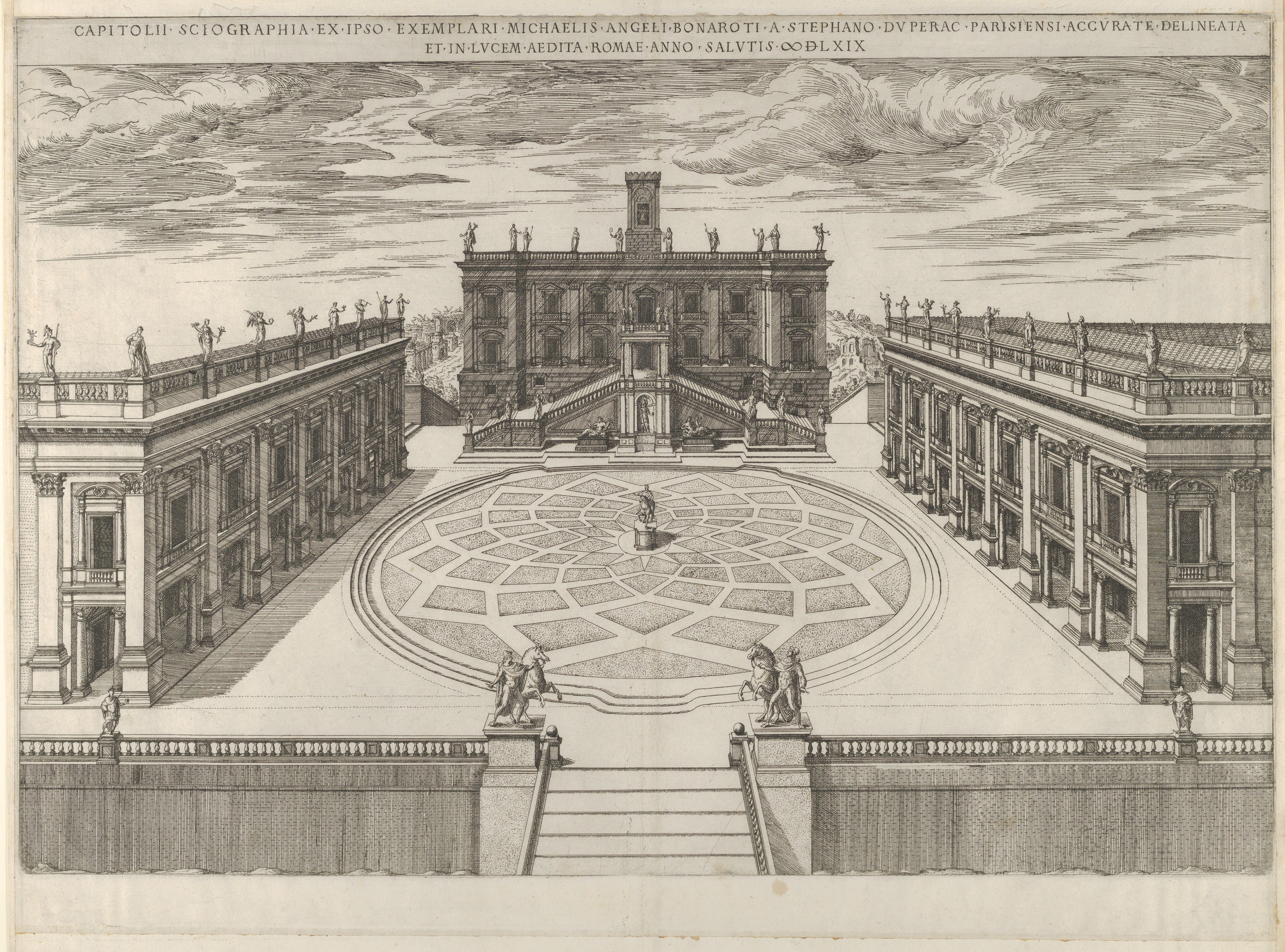
Michelangelo's systematizing of the Campidoglio, engraved by Étienne Dupérac, 1569

The bird's-eye view of the engraving by Étienne Dupérac shows Michelangelo's solution to the problems of the space in the Piazza del Campidoglio. Even with their new facades centering them on the new palazzo at the rear, the space was a trapezoid, and the facades did not face each other squarely. Worse still, the whole site sloped, to the left in the engraving. Michelangelo's solution was radical.

The three remodelled palazzi enclose a harmonious trapezoidal space, approached by the ramped staircase called the cordonata. The stepped ramp of the cordonata was intended, like a slow-moving escalator, to lift its visitors toward the sky and deposit them on the threshold of municipal authority. The oval shape combined with the diamond pattern within it was a play on the previous Renaissance geometries of the circle and square. The travertine design set into the paving is perfectly level: Around its perimeter, low steps arise and die away into the paving as the slope requires.

Its centre springs slightly, so that one senses that he/she is standing on the exposed segment of a gigantic egg all but buried at the centre of the city at the centre of the world, as Michelangelo's historian Charles de Tolnay pointed out. An interlaced twelve-pointed star makes a subtle reference to the constellations, revolving around this space called Caput mundi, Latin for "head of the world." This paving design was never executed by the popes, who may have detected a subtext of less-than-Christian import, but Benito Mussolini ordered the paving completed to Michelangelo's design in 1940.

Michelangelo looked at the center of the site to find a solution to the disorder of the Capitoline building. The statue provided a center and a focus. The buildings defined the space, and it is this space, as much as the buildings, that is the achievement of the Capitoline complex. It is a giant outdoor room, a plaza enclosed and protected but open to the sky and accessible through five symmetrical openings. Axiality and symmetry govern all parts of the Campidoglio. The aspect of the piazza that makes this most immediately apparent is the central statue, with the paving pattern directing the visitors' eyes to its base. Michelangelo also gave the medieval Palazzo del Senatore a central campanile, a renovated façade, and a grand divided external staircase. He designed a new façade for the colonnaded Palazzo dei Conservatori and projected an identical structure, the Palazzo Nuovo, for the opposite side of the piazza. On the narrow side of the trapezoidal plan, he extended the central axis with a stair to link the hilltop with the city below.

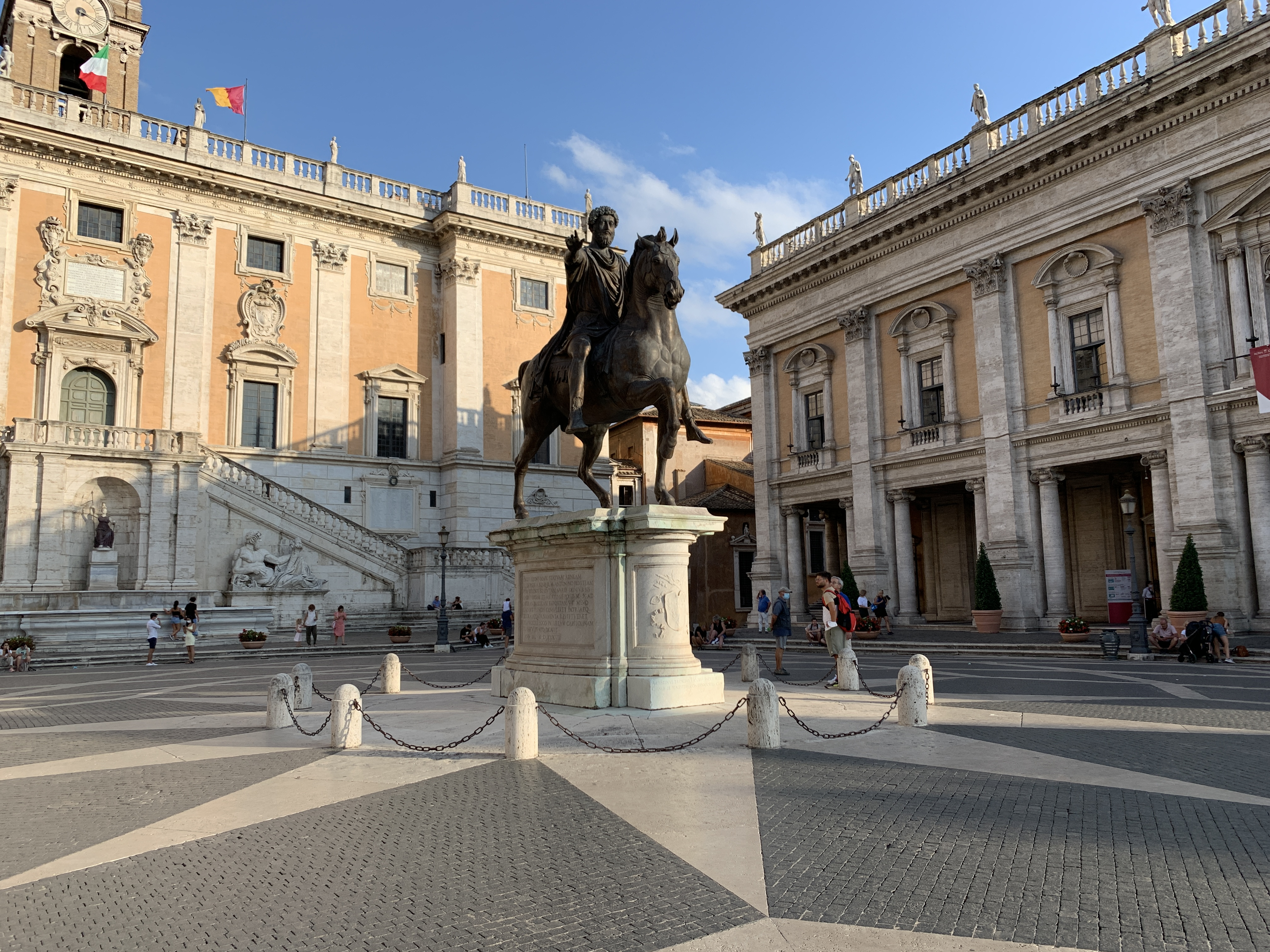
A replica of the equestrian statue of Marcus Aurelius

==== Marcus Aurelius ====
In the middle, and not to Michelangelo's liking, stood the original equestrian statue of the emperor Marcus Aurelius. Michelangelo provided an unassuming pedestal for it. The sculpture was held in regard because it was thought to depict Emperor Constantine, the first Christian Emperor. The bronze now in position is a modern copy; the original is in the Palazzo dei Conservatori nearby.

=== Palazzi ===
Michelangelo provided new fronts to the two official buildings of Rome's civic government, the Palazzo dei Conservatori, Palazzo Senatorio, and Palazzo Nuovo. Michelangelo designed a new façade for the dilapidated Palazzo dei Conservatori and he designed the Palazzo Nuovo to be a mirror complement, thereby providing balance and coherence to the ragged ensemble of existing structures. The construction of these two buildings were carried out after his death under the supervision of Tommaso dei Cavalieri. The sole arched motif in the entire Campidoglio design is the segmental pediments over their windows, which give a slight spring to the completely angular vertical-horizontal balance of the design. The three palazzi are now home to the Capitoline Museums.

==== Palazzo Caffarelli Clementino ====
Adjacent and now serving as an annex to the Palazzo dei Conservatori is Palazzo Caffarelli Clementino; here, short-term exhibitions are held. The palazzo was built between 1576 and 1583 by Gregory Canonico for Gian Pietro Caffarelli II. The remaining ruins of the Temple of Jupiter Optimus Maximus were destroyed in order to construct the palace. Until the cessation of World War I, the palazzo served as the German Embassy to Rome. Following the war, it was claimed by the Comune di Roma, which demolished a large section of the palazzo's east wing to create the Caffarelli Terrace.

==== Palazzo dei Conservatori ====
The Palazzo dei Conservatori ("Palazzo of the Conservators") was built in the Middle Ages for the local magistrates (named "Conservatori of Rome") on top of a sixth-century BC temple dedicated to Jupiter "Maximus Capitolinus". Michelangelo's renovation of it incorporated the first use of a giant order that spanned two storeys, here with a range of Corinthian pilasters and subsidiary Ionic columns flanking the ground-floor loggia openings and the second-floor windows. Michelangelo's new portico is a reinvention of older ideas. The portico contains entablatures and a flat, coffered ceiling.

The entablatures rest on columns set at the front of each bay, while matching half-columns stand against the back wall. Each pilaster forms a compound unit with the pier and column on either side of it. Colossal pilasters set on large bases join the portico and the upper story. All of the windows are capped with segmental pediments. A balustrade fringing the roof emphasizes the emphatic horizontality of the whole against which the vertical lines of the orders rise in majestic contrast. The verticality of the colossal order creates the feeling of a self-contained space while the horizontality of the entablatures and balustrades emphasize the longitudinal axis of the piazza. The palazzo's facade was updated by Michelangelo in the 1530s and again later numerous times.

In Rome, the portico of the Palazzo dei Conservatori sheltered offices of various guilds. Here disputes arising in the transaction of business were adjudicated, unless they were of sufficient importance to go before a communal tribunal, such as that of the conservatori. It was a natural place for such activity. Until the 1470s the main market of the city was held on and around the Campidoglio, while cattle continued to be taxed and sold in the ancient forum located just to the south.

==== Palazzo Senatorio ====
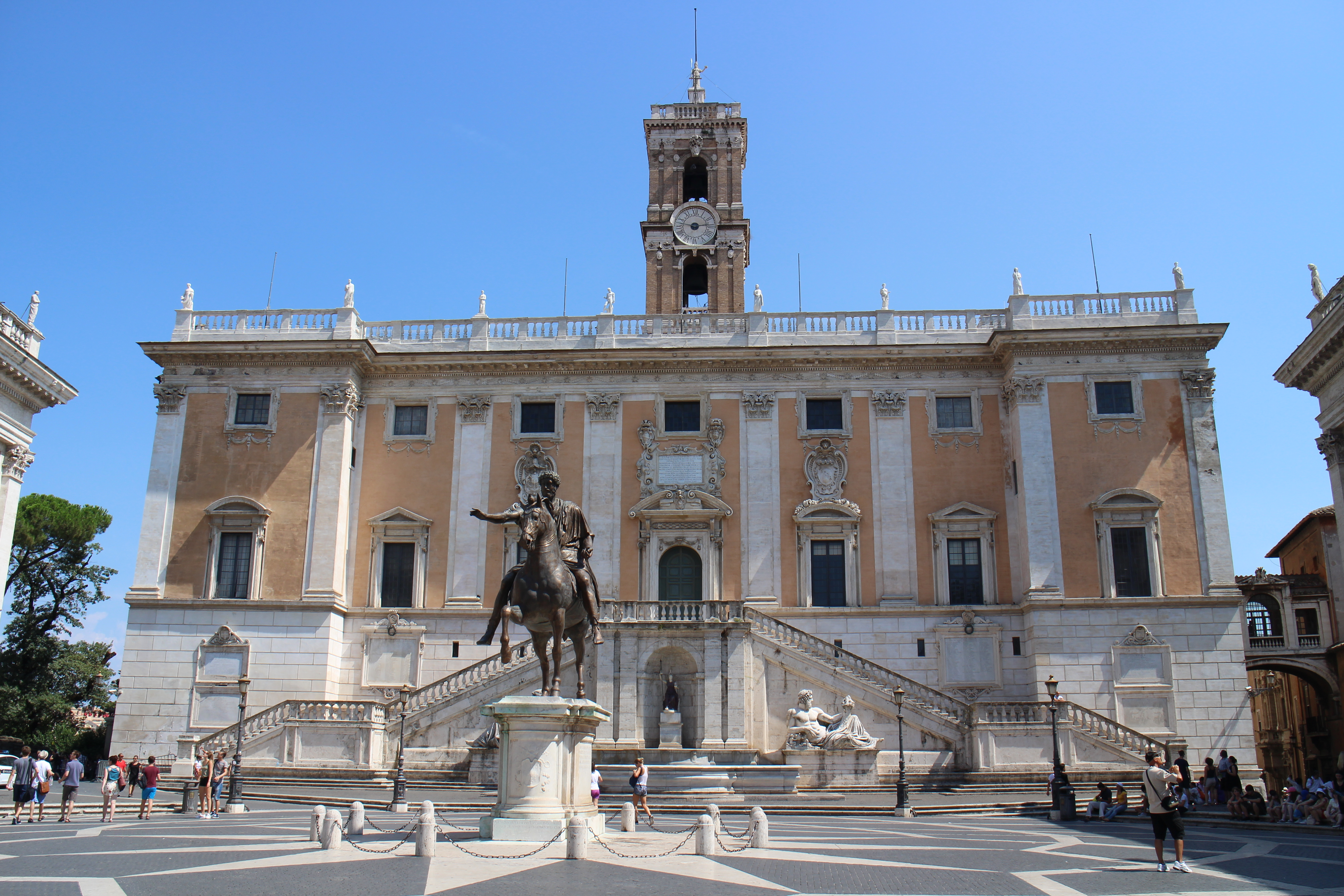
Palazzo Senatorio

Built during the 13th and 14th centuries, the Palazzo Senatorio ("Senatorial palace") stands atop the Tabularium, which had once housed the archives of ancient Rome. Peperino blocks from the Tabularium were re-used in the left side of the palazzo and a corner of the bell tower. It now houses the Roman city hall, after having been converted into a residence by Giovanni Battista Piranesi for the Senator Abbondio Rezzonico in the 18th century.

Its double ramp of stairs was designed by Michelangelo. This double stairway to the palazzo replaced the old flight of steps and two-storied loggia, which had stood on the right side of the palazzo. The staircase cannot be seen solely in terms of the building to which it belongs but must be set in the context of the piazza as a whole. The steps, beginning at the center of each wing, move gently upward until they reach the inner corner, level off and recede to the main surface of the façade. They then continue an unbroken stateliness toward each other, converging on the central doorway of the second story.

This interruption of the diagonal line and the brief inward change of direction both absorbs the central axis and links the two sides. The fountain in front of the staircase features the river gods of the Tiber and the Nile as well as Dea Roma. The upper part of the facade was designed by Michelangelo with colossal corinthian pilasters harmonizing with the two other buildings. Its bell-tower was designed by Martino Longhi the Elder and built between 1578 and 1582. Its current facade was built by Giacomo della Porta and Girolamo Rainaldi.

==== Palazzo Nuovo ====
To close off the piazza's symmetry and cover up the tower of the Aracoeli, the Palazzo Nuovo was constructed in 1603, finished in 1654, and opened to the public in 1734. Its facade duplicates to that of Palazzo dei Conservatori. In other words, it is an identical copy made using Michelangelo's blueprint when he redesigned the Palazzo dei Conservatori a century earlier.

=== Balustrade ===
A balustrade, punctuated by sculptures atop the giant pilasters, capped the composition, one of the most influential of Michelangelo's designs. The two massive ancient statues of Castor and Pollux that decorate the balustrades are not the same as those posed by Michelangelo, which now are in front of the Palazzo del Quirinale.

=== Cordonata ===
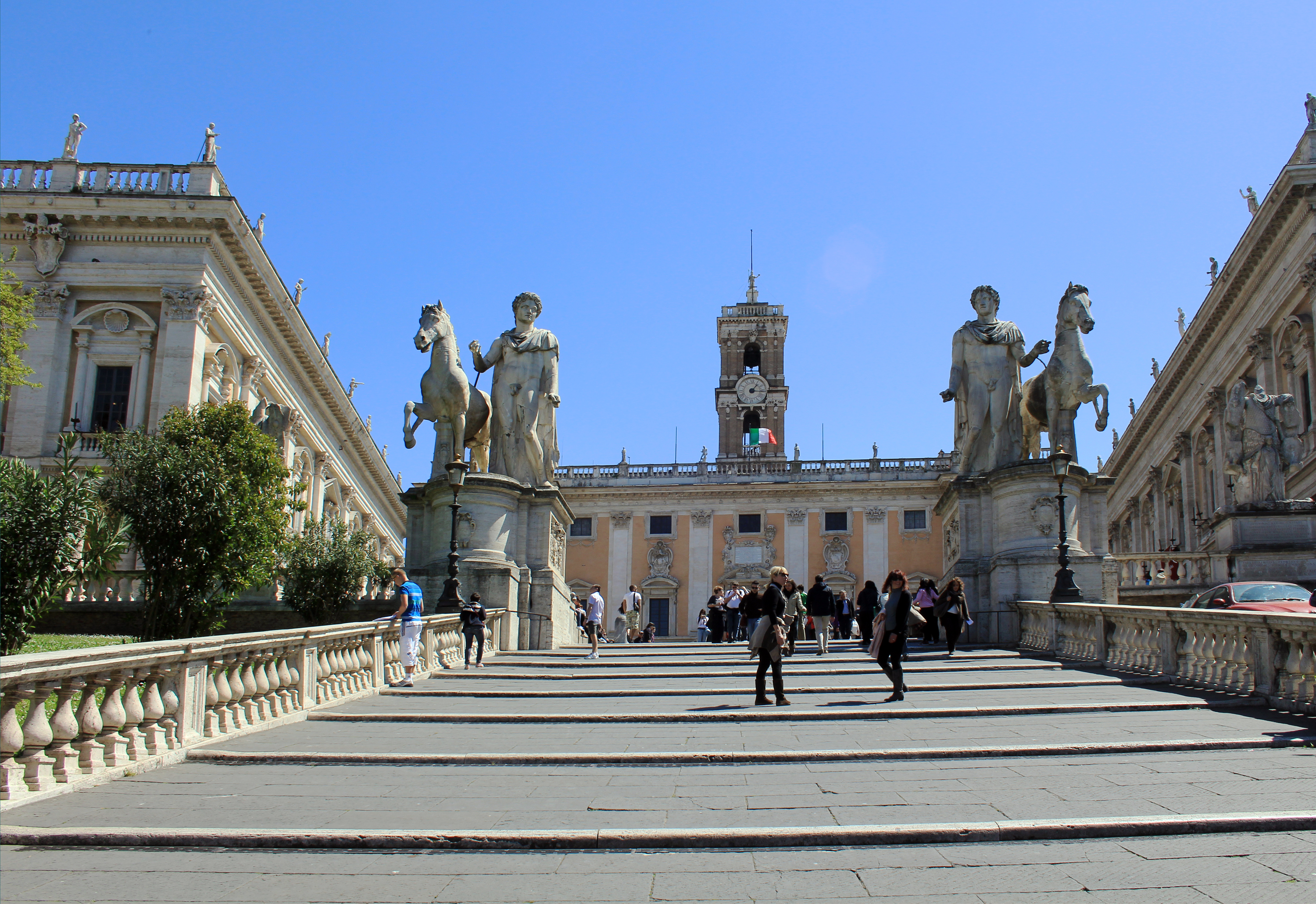
The Capitoline Hill cordonata (centre of picture) leading from Via del Teatro di Marcello to Piazza del Campidoglio

Next to the older and much steeper stairs leading to the Aracoeli, Michelangelo devised a monumental wide-ramped stair, the cordonata, gradually ascending the hill to reach the high piazza, so that the Campidoglio resolutely turned its back on the Roman Forum that it had once commanded. It was built to be wide enough for horse riders to ascend the hill without dismounting. The railings are topped by the statues of two Egyptian lions in black basalt at their base and the marble renditions of Castor and Pollux at their top.

On the grassy incline to the northwest of the cordonata is the Monument to Cola di Rienzo installed in 1886.

== Influence ==
Influenced by Roman architecture and Roman republican times, the word Capitolium still lives in the English word capitol. The Capitol Hill in Washington, D.C., is widely assumed to be named after the Capitoline Hill.

== See also ==
- Aventine Hill (Aventino)
- Caelian Hill (Celio)
- Capitoline Brutus
- Cispian Hill (Cispio)
- Esquiline Hill (Esquilino)
- Janiculum Hill (Gianicolo)
- Monte Mario
- Oppian Hill (Oppio)
- Palatine Hill (Palatino)
- Pincian Hill (Pincio)
- Quirinal Hill (Quirinale)
- Vatican Hill (Vaticano)
- Velian Hill (Velia)
- Viminal Hill (Viminale)
