= Temple of Veiovis =

Ancient Roman temple

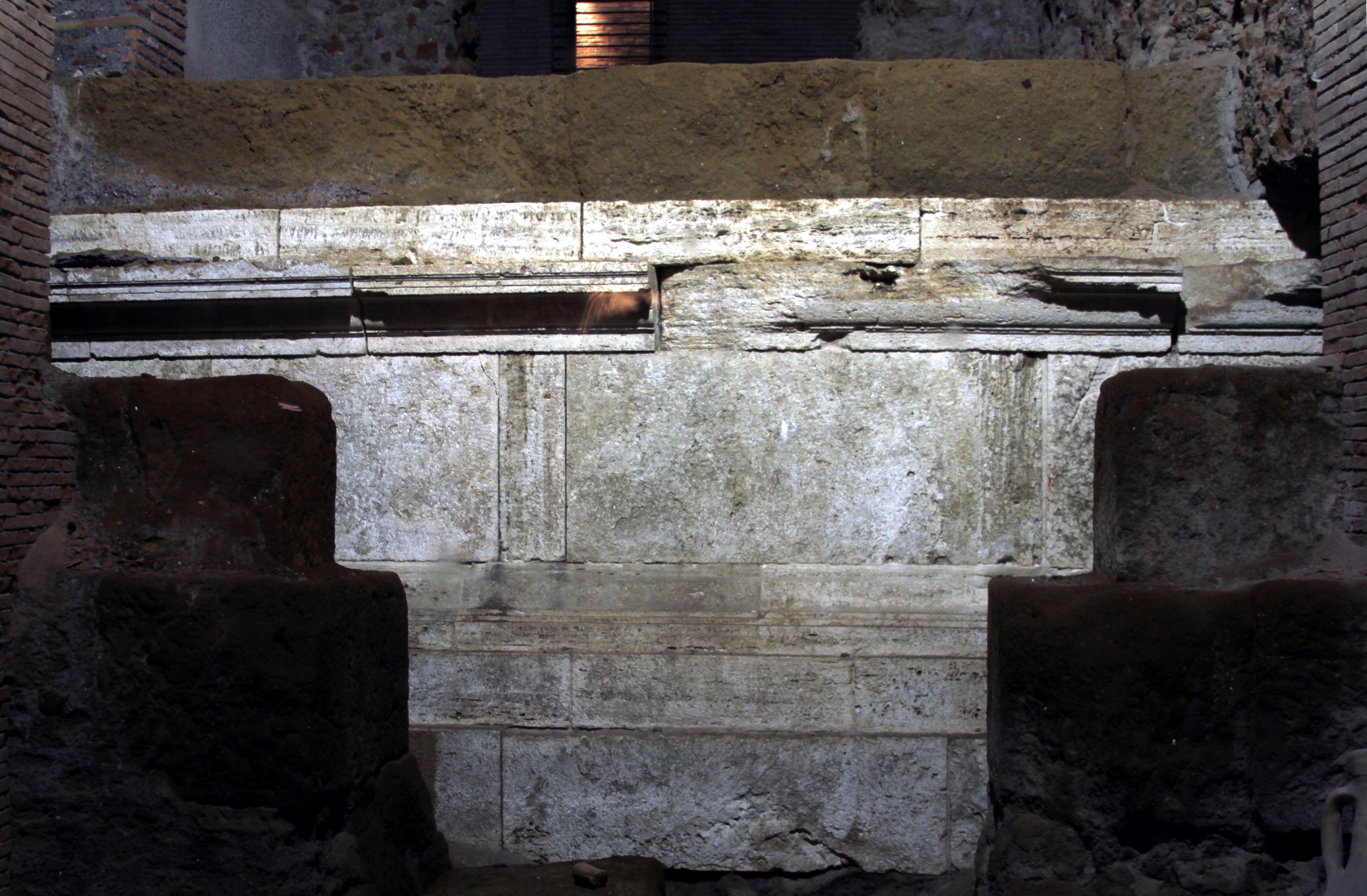
- Remains of the Templum Veiovi beneath the Tabularium

- Shown in ancient Rome
- Interactive map of Temple of Veiovis
- 41°53′34″N 12°29′1″E

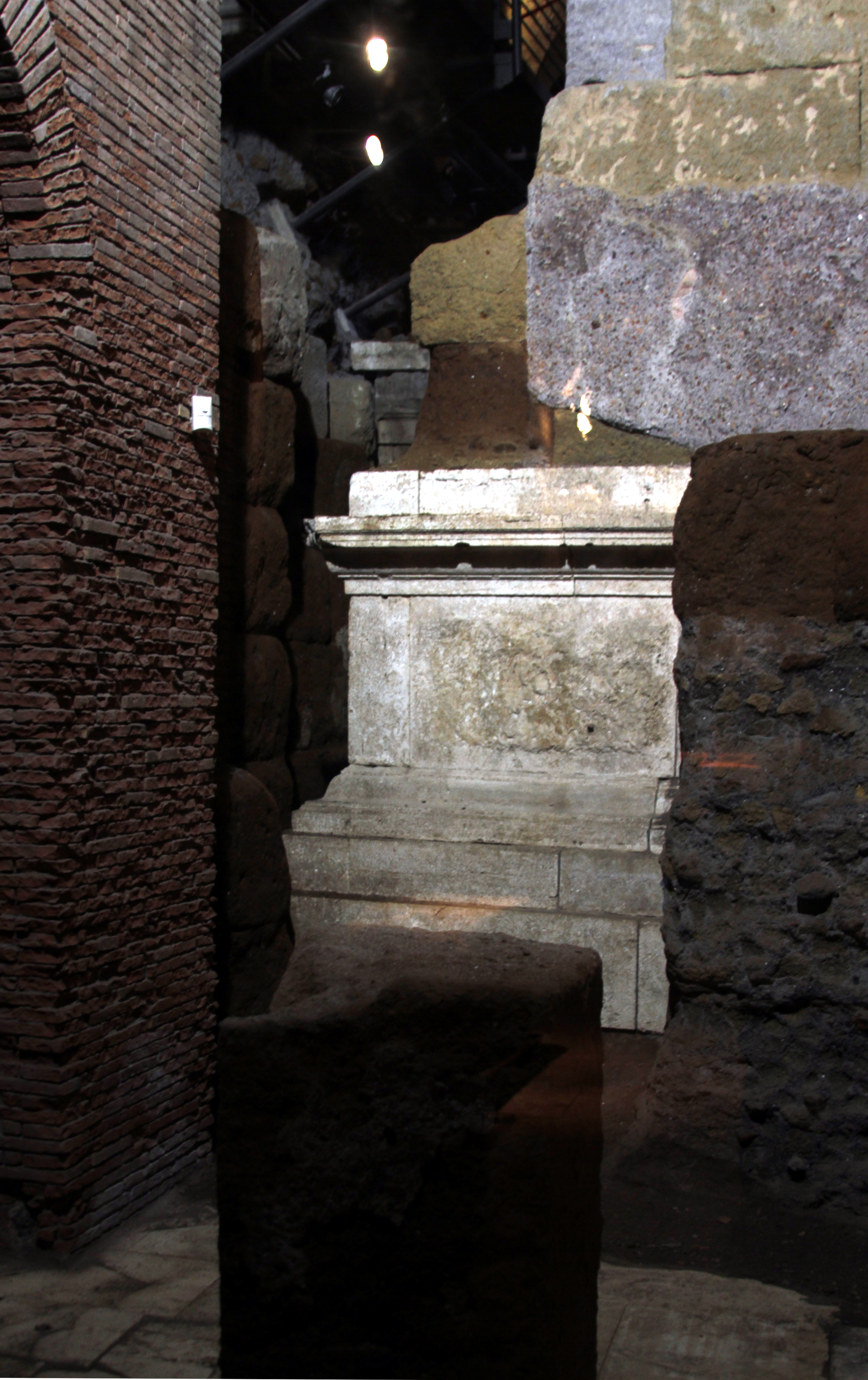
Remains of the Templum Veiovi beneath the Tabularium

The Temple of Veiovis in ancient Rome was the temple of the god Veiovis, built sometime in the early 1st century BC.

== In literature ==
The temple was sited in the saddle of ground "inter duos lucos", between two sacred groves, one on the Arx and one on the Capitolium (the two peaks of the Capitoline Hill). The statue of the god stood next to a statue of a goat. In the same area was also situated the Asylum, where, legend has it, Romulus extended hospitality to fugitives from other parts of the Latium region, to populate the new city which he founded, with political refugees, escaped slaves, Latins and Etruscans, and, as Florus has it, Phrygians and Arcadians.

Its construction was vowed in 200 BC by the praetor Lucius Furius Purpurio in the Battle of Cremona during the war against the Boii, and then dedicated in 192 BC by Quintus Marcius Ralla.

== In archaeology ==
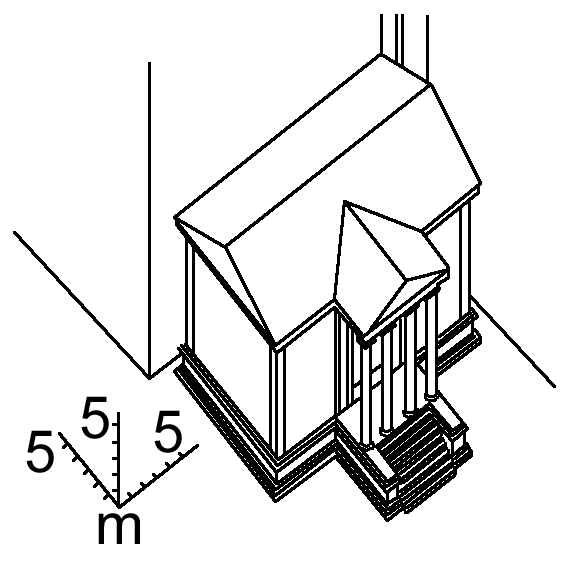
Axonometric view of a reconstruction of the Temple of Veiovis in its last reconstruction

The remains of a temple were excavated in 1939 under Benito Mussolini, during the excavation underneath Piazza del Campidoglio for the creation of the Gallery Junction. This may now be seen in the tabularium under the Capitoline Museums. It had been saved by being superimposed underneath the foundation of later buildings on the site of the Capitoline Hill. It was identified as the temple of Veiovis from the ancient sources and from the discovery of a marble cult statue in its cella. The sources state that his statue had a beardless head and carried a bundle of arrows in his right hand.

The chief feature of this temple, and one which is not shared by many other Roman buildings – probably on account of the very limited space available – is the transversally-elongated cella, whose width is almost double its depth (15 x 8.90 metres). The temple's high podium has a lime-and-mortar internal nucleus lined with travertine marble, the same stone that was used to pave the temple court. The façade runs in line with the road that climbs up from the Clivus Capitolinus, and features a pronaos with four pillars in the central part, preceded by a flight of steps.

Three distinct building phases have been identified, the last of which has been dated to the first quarter of the 1st century BC and is linked with the building of the Tabularium. The temple was then restored by Emperor Domitian with the addition of brick pillars and coloured marble lining the floor and cella walls.

== See also ==
- List of Ancient Roman temples

== Sources ==
- Capitoline Museums
