= Tabularium =

Official records office of ancient Rome

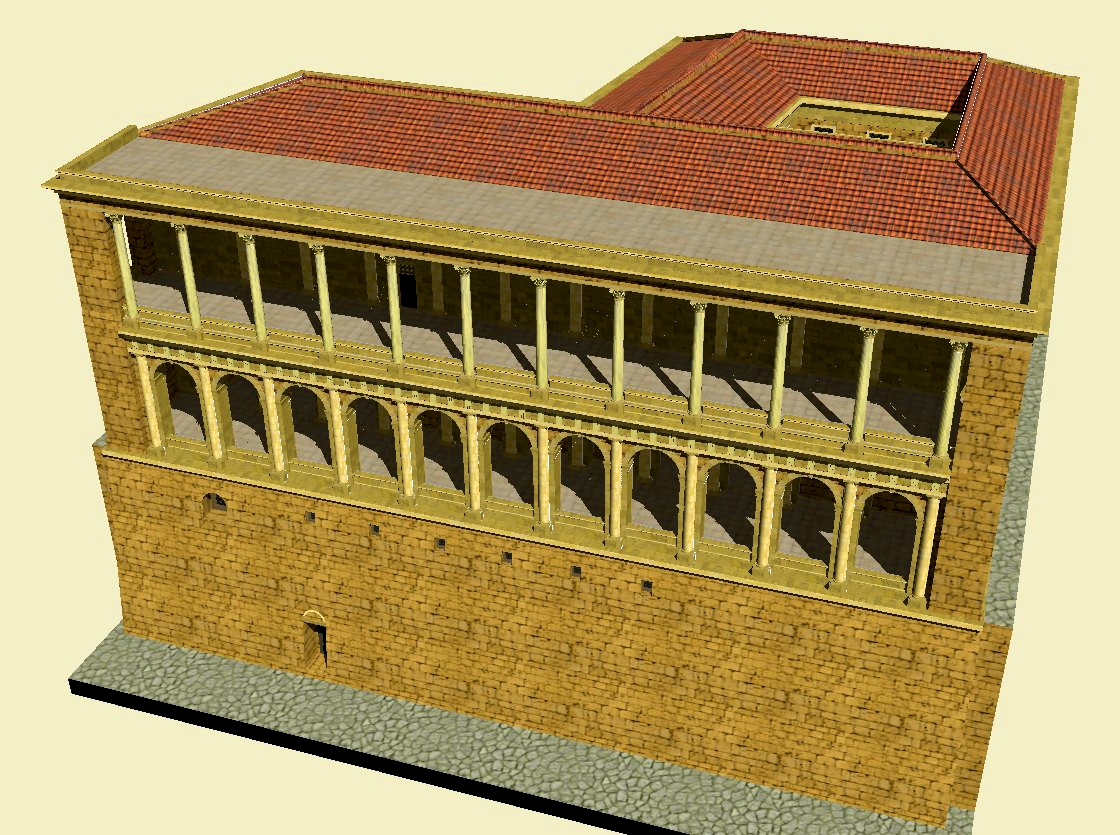
- Computer generated image of the Tabularium

- Shown within Augustan Rome
- Interactive map of Tabularium
- 41°53′34″N 12°29′01″E
- Type: Basilica
- Location: Regio VIII Forum Romanum

History
- Built: 78 BC
- Built by: M. Aemilius Lepidus and Q. Lutatius Catulus

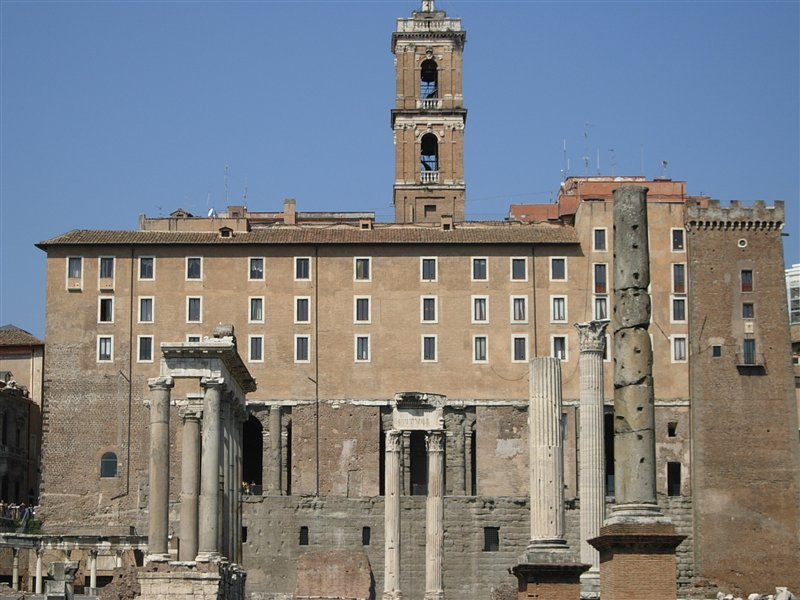
The Tabularium, behind the corner columns of the Temple of Vespasian and Titus

The Tabularium was the official records office of ancient Rome and housed the offices of many city officials. Situated within the Roman Forum, it was on the front slope of the Capitoline Hill, below the Temple of Jupiter Optimus Maximus, to the southeast of the Arx.

Within the building were the remains of the Temple of Veiovis. In front of it were the Temples of Vespasian and Concord, as well as the Rostra and the rest of the forum. Presently, the Tabularium is only accessible from within the Capitoline Museums, although it still provides a panoramic view over the forum.

The construction of the Tabularium was ordered around 78 BC by the dictator Lucius Cornelius Sulla. The building was completed by Quintus Lutatius Catulus Capitolinus, consul in 78 BC. This was part of a public works programme for the redevelopment of the Capitoline Hill, which had been damaged by a fire in 83 BC. The construction by Catulus is not mentioned in the ancient literature. It is known through an inscription.

== Architecture ==
The building itself had a facade of peperino and travertine blocks. The interior vaults are of concrete.

Its great corridor, 67 m (220 ft) long, raised 15 m (49 ft) above the forum on a massive substructure, and is still partly preserved. This corridor was lighted through a series of arches divided by semi-detached columns of the Doric order, the earliest example of this class of decoration, which is in the Theatre of Marcellus, the Colosseum, and all the great amphitheatres throughout the Roman Empire, constituted the decorative treatment of the wall surface and gave scale to the structure.

The facade faced the back of the Temple of Concord in the forum and consisted of three levels. The first story was a large and tall fortified wall with a single door and only small windows near the top to light the interior, forum-level rooms. The second story featured a Doric arcade (partially preserved) and the third, no longer extant story, had a high Corinthian order colonnade. The upper floors of this structure were much changed in the 13th century, when the Palazzo dei Senatori was built.

Some scholars, such as Filippo Coarelli, in the past, have suggested that the Tabularium itself is unattested in any literary sources. Furthermore, its function and purpose have been the subject of debate. The unity of the main structure does, however, suggest that the building was at least initially conceived to serve a singular purpose. To illustrate the complexity of the building, Filippo Coarelli has stated that a particular annex of the Aerarium Saturni was constructed specifically to house metal ingots and minted Republican coins. Recent evidence, in the form of six military diplomas dated from 85 to 88 AD, confirms the existence of the Tabularium in its renowned form. Coarelli has suggested that the Tabularium can be dated precisely to 78 BC, although construction began many years prior and almost certainly prior to the death of Sulla. The building itself is in many ways intrinsically tied to the politics of Sulla, especially in regard to the temple substructure.

The structure was considered such an enduring masterpiece of late Republican architecture that a funerary inscription for the architect, commissioned by Lutatius Catalus, was created and preserved in a courtyard of the hospital of the Fatebenefatelli, on Tiber Island. The inscription reads as follows: "Lucius Cornelius, son of Lucius, of the Voturia tribe, chief engineer to Q. Lucius Catulus when he was consul, architect (to him) when he was censor."

== Modern scholarship ==
Nicholas Purcell's article "Atrium Libertatis" is aligned with the view of contemporary historians regarding the epigraphic evidence once present within the Tabularium. In his detailed analysis of the now-lost inscriptions, Purcell makes clear that these inscriptions have compounded our misunderstanding of one of the largest, oldest and best-preserved buildings of the Roman Republic.

The generic terms probatio of a substructio and a Tabularium were recorded by an early Renaissance antiquarian in that order. It is arguable that the identification of the so-called "Tabularium" is incorrect. Purcell draws our attention to the lack of archaeological and epigraphic knowledge on tabularia, suggesting that these inscriptions were not intended to be grandiose in scope, nor did they name the building, which further reflects the prevailing credulity of the structure in question. Purcell's reference to the archaeological research conducted by Theodor Mommsen aligns with his argument and likely indicates that historians must set aside such misunderstandings reflected in the literary sources. As Mommsen stated quite rightly, that Tabularium may refer to any structure associated with administration. Therefore, it is likely that the Tabularium in question, despite the sheer size fronting the Capitoline Hill, was one of many structures built for the purpose of holding records.

Purcell's assessment of the epigraphic evidence once found within the structure in question reaffirms the following view, long held by academics, that the Tabularium is insufficiently documented and the product of scholarly inertia. This, unfortunately, has further compounded our understanding of the Capitoline substructure and, as a result, we are no closer to identifying the extent of its function, let alone its name.

An article by Pier Luigi Tucci (2005) radically changed the way historians and archaeologists alike would view the Tabularium, questioning the very identification of the structure and its function. Exploring the history of archaeology at the site, Tucci makes clear that the identification of the so-called Tabularium is hinged solely upon an inscription long lost (CIL VI 1314 = CIL I 737), with no ancient evidence from the period directly correlating to the site. As such, it is arguable that the word "Tabularium" itself has been used incorrectly in modern scholarship with reference to the building. Instead, Tucci argues that the substructure, which provides the foundations for the entire building, was itself likely a Tabularium, being one of many offices housed within Roman buildings and temples for the purpose of holding records. As such, Tucci disputes the idea that a sole Tabularium or mass archive of Rome ever existed. In alignment with this argument, Tucci subsequently seeks to identify the structure in occupation of the space above the Tabularium substructure. In examining the architectural link between the rooms of the substructure and that of a south-western building, Tucci, in accordance with historians before him, could identify the remnants of an extension of the aerarium, or treasury, which was housed in the Temple of Saturn. Subsequently, in correlation with the accounts of Livy (7.28.4–6), Ovid (Fasti 6.183–185), and Cicero (De domo 38.101), Tucci draws attention to a clear association between the location of this mint and that of the Temple of Juno Moneta. With reference to the archaeological research of Giannelli and his identification of concrete remains in the Aracoeli Garden in the forum, Tucci argues for the foundations of Giannelli's supposed Temple of Juno Moneta to date back to the 4th century BC, thus indicating a relocation. Tucci's argument thus is fulfilled as he concludes that in circa 78 BC, the Temple of Juno Moneta was rededicated atop the substructure of the Tabularium, in a complex which included the extended aerarium, and that this relocation likely occurred after the fire of 83 BC. As a result, Tucci called into question both the identification and function of the so-called Tabularium, in his attempt to overturn a theory that had been taken for historical fact since the 15th century AD.

Fillipo Coarelli (2010) uses the arguments and findings of Nicholas Purcell (1993), Henner von Hesberg (1995), and Pier Luigi Tucci (2005) to propose an alternative understanding of the function of the Tabularium. These works are characterised by their ability to provide alternative understandings when questioning the function of the Tabularium. Before these studies, research and scholarship of the Tabularium was primarily saturated by Richard Delbrück's Hellenistische Bauten in Latium, published in 1875. It was Delbrück's findings that rendered the conclusion that the Tabularium served as a house of public records. However, writing in 2010, Coarelli has had access to a wider range of both archaeological and written sources that probe a deeper inquiry into traditional discourses that cloud our conception of the function and meaning of the Tabularium.

Within Substructio et tabularium, Coarelli fundamentally purports that "the so-called Tabularium is not the archive of the Roman State, known by this name, and the rejection of this long-held but incorrect hypothesis permits us to study the monument afresh". He goes on to state that "[the Tabularium] represents in fact the foundations (substructio) of a large temple of the Sullan period, restored by Domitian after the fire of 80 AD". Throughout his work, Coarelli uses the findings of Purcell, von Hesberg, and Tucci as a roadmap that forms the basis of his argument. He begins with Purcell's epigraphic discoveries that connotes the classification of the Tabularium as a records building: Populi tabularia ubi publici continentur (tabularia of the [Roman] people where the public [documents] are housed). Moving to von Hesberg, Coarelli highlights the study of the dimensions of architectural pieces from the Tabularium that suggest "the second floor of the building must have been significantly wider than the arched lower floor", proposing that there was a temple structure within the Tabularium. Finally, Coarelli's inclusion of Tucci's findings builds upon von Hesberg's assertion, serving as a sounding board for Coarelli's initial thesis that the Tabularium served as the basement of a proposed temple.

Coarelli tracks the structural changes that took place within the Tabularium, and ultimately concludes that it is challenging for historians to ascertain the absolute meaning of this structure due to the "complexity of [it]". He points out that only recently have we been able to understand that the Tabularium actually existed due to the emergence of six military diplomas, with dates ranging from 85–88 AD. Further, these diplomas refer to the location of the Tabularium publicum to the Capitolium. Here, the location is extremely significant. Coarelli states that the Tabularium "must have been situated in the immediate environs of the area Capitolina, where the military diplomas were displayed until 90 AD". Thus, it is clear that the Tabularium was a multifaceted building that pertained to the political and religious culture of the Roman Empire.

Thus, by expanding upon the arguments of Purcell, von Hesberg, and Tucci, Coarelli positions himself to further execute his overarching thesis with increased clarity. Fundamentally, by galvanising the "deep-rooted biases" that obfuscate the understanding of the Tabularium, Coarelli is able to suggest that the Tabularium is rather a multifaceted structure that pertained to the political and religious centre of the Roman world.

== See also ==
- Roman architecture
- List of Roman domes

== Notes ==
Preceded by Porticus Octaviae	Landmarks of Rome; Tabularium	Succeeded by Circus Maximus
