= Temple of Vespasian and Titus =

Imperial-era temple in the Roman Forum

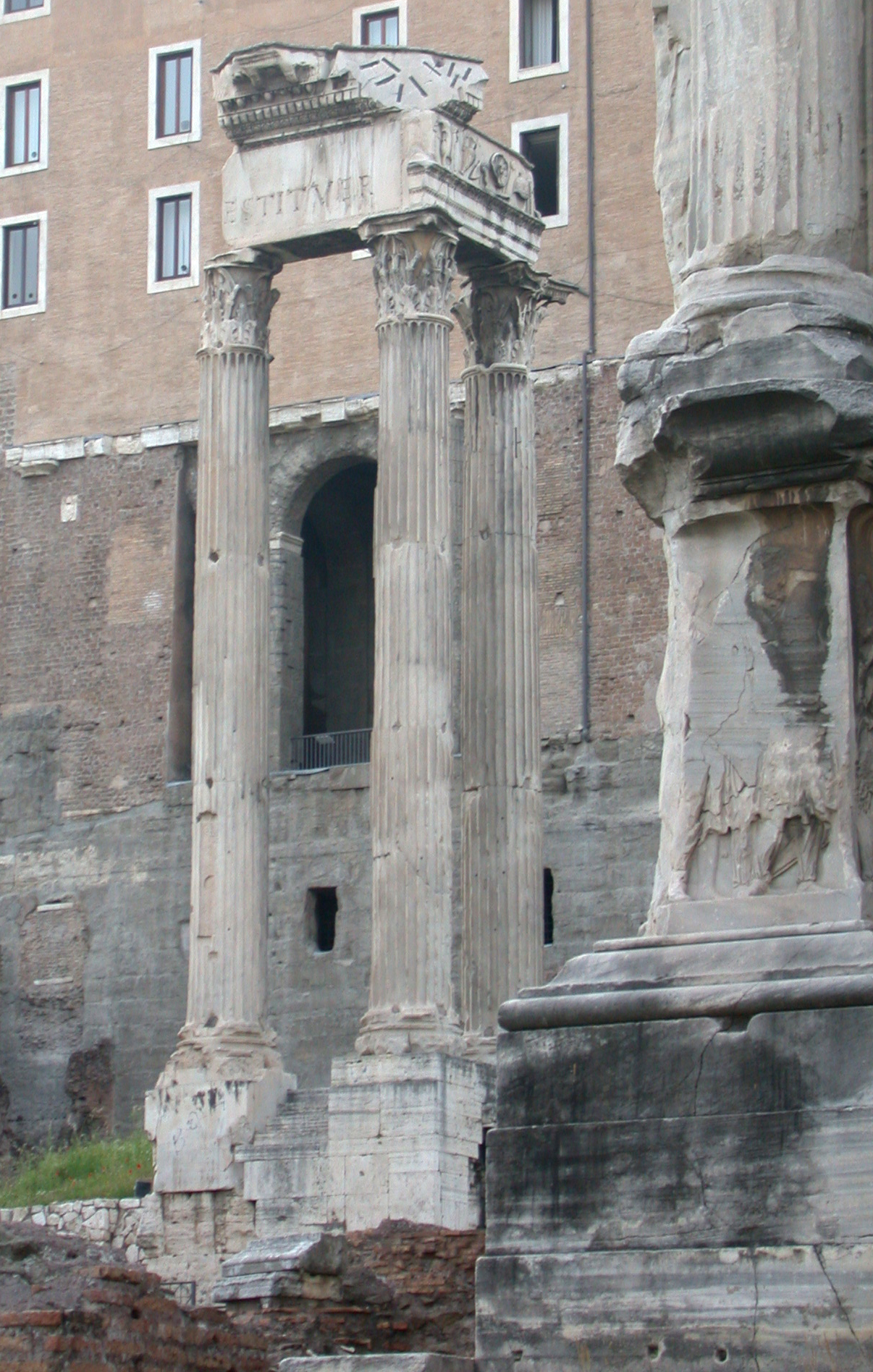
- Temple of Vespasian and Titus

- Location within Rome
- Interactive map of Temple of Vespasian and Titus
- 41.892727°N 12.483891°E
- Type: Roman Temple
- Location: Regio VIII Forum Romanum

History
- Built: 79
- Built by: Titus and Domitian

The so-called Temple of Vespasian and Titus (Latin: Templum divi Vespasiani, Italian: Tempio di Vespasiano) is located in Rome at the western end of the Roman Forum between the Temple of Concordia and the Temple of Saturn. It was dedicated to the deified Vespasian. It was begun by Titus in 79 after Vespasian's death and Titus's succession. Titus’ brother, Domitian, completed and dedicated the temple in approximately 87.

== Importance ==
Throughout Roman history, there was an emphasis on increasing the fame and glory of a family name, often through monuments commemorating the deceased. Therefore, the temple was constructed to honor the Flavian Dynasty, which comprised the emperors Vespasian (69–79), Titus (79–81), and Domitian (81–96). Historians question whether or not Titus and Domitian had a good relationship; however, Domitian ensured the deification of his brother into the imperial cult in order to exalt the prominence of the Flavian name. Titus and Vespasian were each deified through the ceremony of apotheosis. In doing so, tradition guaranteed that Roman citizens and subjects would honor Vespasian and Titus (or at least honor their genius) as Roman deities. This imperial cult worship was as much a sign of allegiance to the emperor of Rome, or as a political and diplomatic gesture, as it was a formal religion.

== Structure ==
The Temple of Vespasian was in the Corinthian order, hexastyle (i.e. with a portico six columns wide), and prostyle (i.e. with free standing columns that are widely spaced apart in a row). It was particularly narrow due to the limited space, measuring 33 meters long and 22 wide. In a constricted space between the temple and the Temple of Concord, a small, two-story vaulted room made of brick and concrete, and lined with marble, was built against the wall of the Tabularium, and apparently was dedicated to Titus.

== History ==
=== Construction and renovation ===
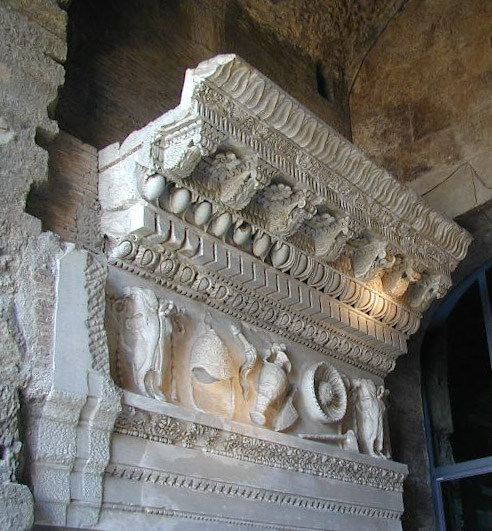
The pediment and frieze, in the tabularium.

Titus began construction and presumably finished the foundations, made of tuff concrete, and the core of the podium, made of white marble. Domitian, however, completed the interior work after Titus’ death.

The original inscription on the upper part of the architrave reads:

DIVO VESPASIANO AVGUSTO S. P. Q. R.

The cella (inner) walls were in travertine, lined with marbles imported at great expense from the eastern provinces. The interior is highly ornate and the frieze depicts sacred objects that would have been used as the symbols, or badges, of the various priestly collegia in Rome. Around 200 to 205, Emperors Septimius Severus and his son, Antoninus Caracalla, conducted renovations on the temple.

Beneath the previous inscription a new one is added:

IMPP. CAESS. SEVERVS ET ANTONINVS PII FELIC[ES] AVGG RESTITVER[ENT].

Only the last word is saved on the frieze of the front.

=== Medieval and modern history ===
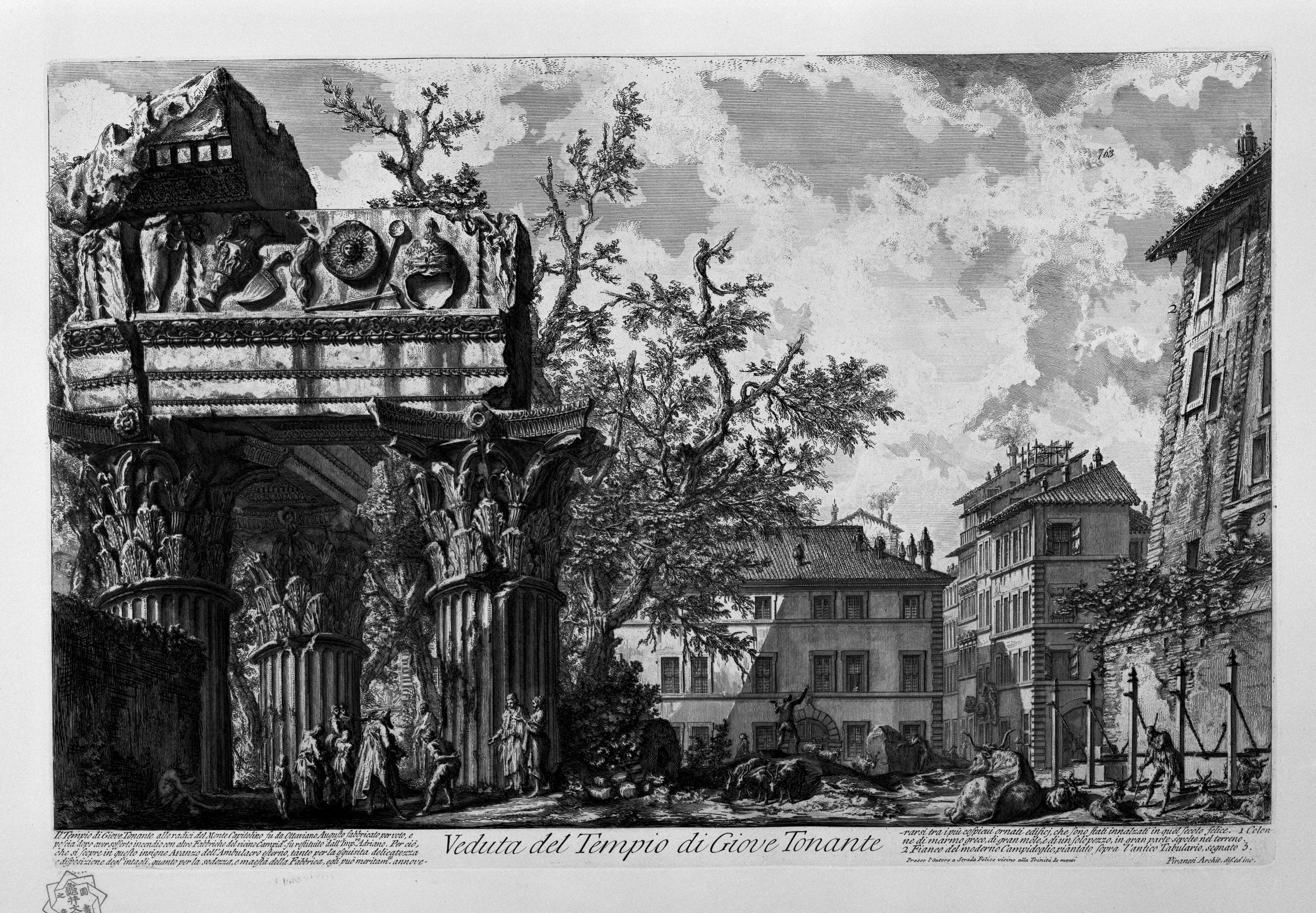
Engraving of corner columns c. 1756 by Piranesi.

The temple suffered significant damage during medieval times, particularly c. 1300 (under Pope Boniface VIII), and in Pope Nicholas V's remodelling of the Forum (which involved the demolition of both angles of the temple on the Forum side and the reconstruction of its front as a fortress with corner towers). All that survives today is the podium's core (with some of its peperino lining), parts of the cella (two fragments of its travertine wall and part of the pedestal at its back for the cult statues), and three Corinthian columns at pronaos's south-east corner.

== See also ==
- List of Ancient Roman temples
